= List of banks and credit unions in Canada =

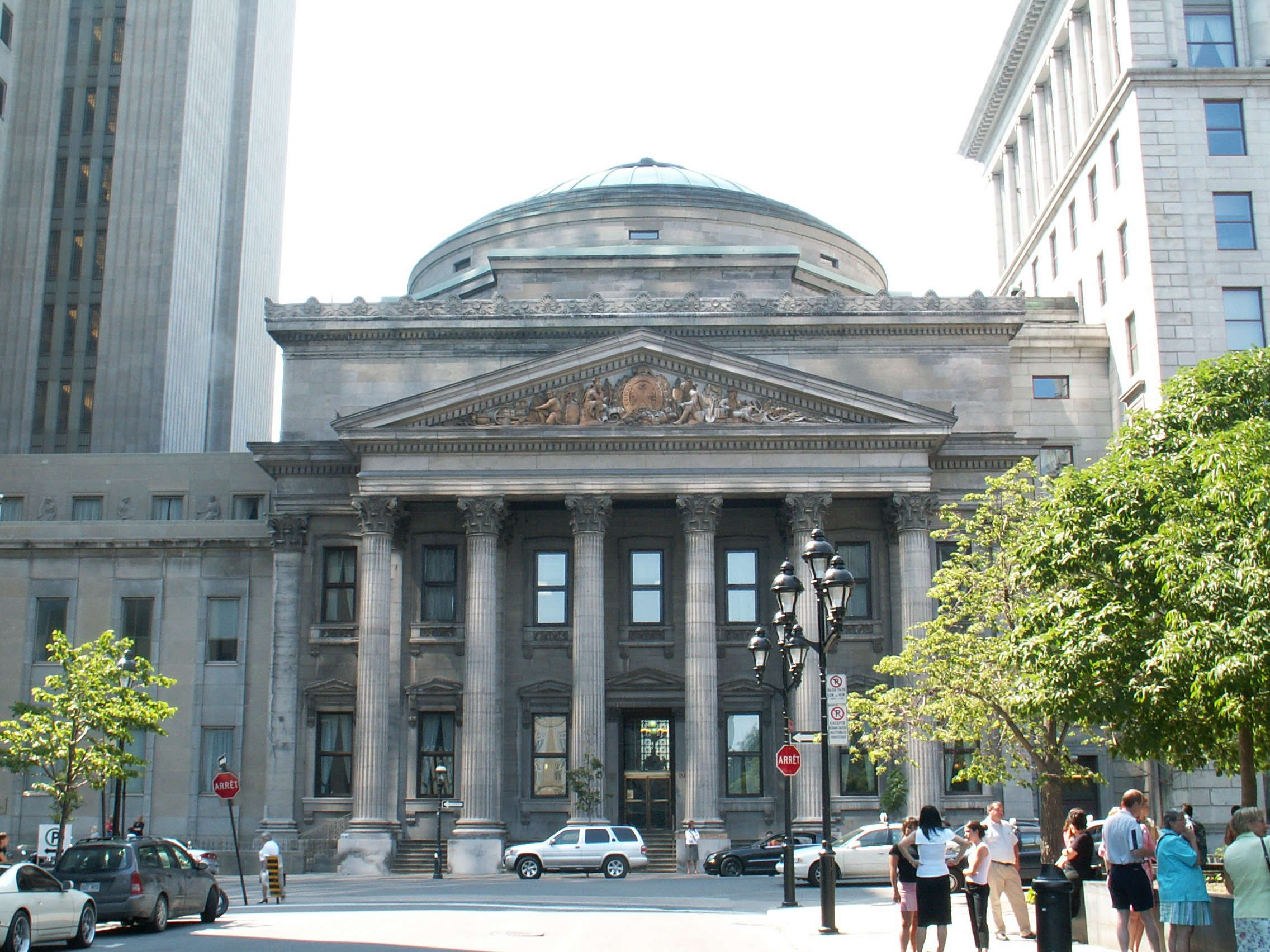
The main Montreal branch of the Bank of Montreal, Canada's oldest bank.

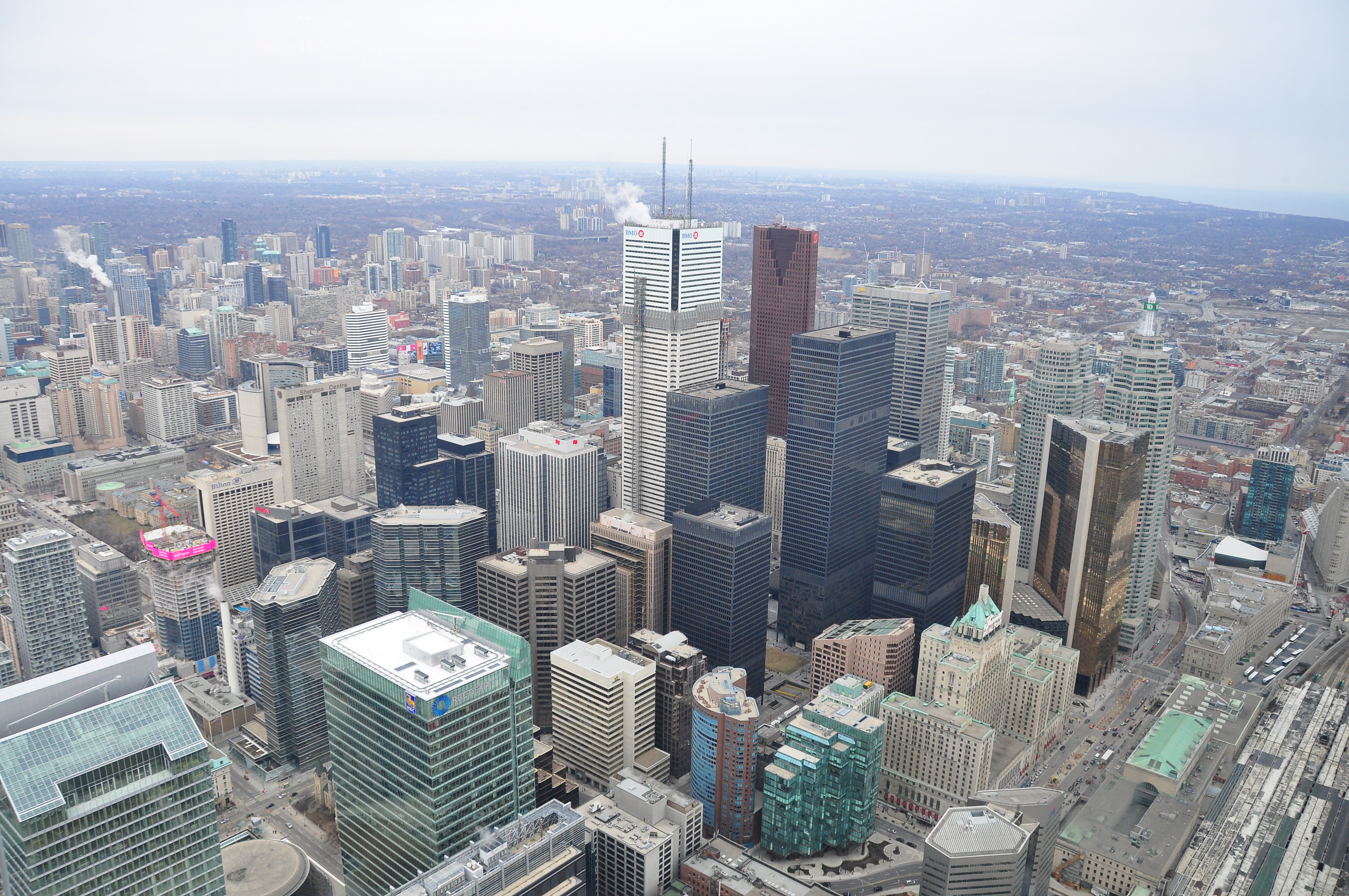
Toronto's financial district

This is a list of banks in Canada, including chartered banks, credit unions, trusts, and other financial services companies that offer banking services and may be popularly referred to as "banks".

== Largest banks ==
=== Big Five ===
The top five Canadian banks are collectively referred to as the "Big Five" due to their dominant position and significant influence within the country's banking and financial industry. This term has been used for many years to characterize these major banks, and it highlights their substantial market share and impact on Canada's economy. The financial sector of Canada is especially concentrated in these banks, which has been seen as a result of protectionist policies of the government and the country's small and dispersed population. These banks grew at an extraordinary rate of 10.7 percent per year, on average, from 2008 to 2018 compared with 3.64 percent for the five largest U.S. banks. While most Canadian banks operate only within Canada, the Big Five are best described as Canadian multinational financial conglomerates that each have a large Canadian banking division.

Bank Name	Abbreviation	Institutional No.	Financial Metrics (2023, CAD, Billions)			Employees (FTE)	Source
Bank Name	Abbreviation	Institutional No.	Market capitalization	Revenue	Net income	Employees (FTE)	Source
Royal Bank of Canada	RBC	003	$187.21	$53.66	$14.86	95,000+	
Toronto-Dominion Bank	TD	004	$154.21	$49.20	$10.78	103,257	
Bank of Montreal	BMO	001	$93.86	$29.02	$4.37	55,767	
Bank of Nova Scotia	Scotiabank	002	$76.32	$29.25	$7.41	89,483	
Canadian Imperial Bank of Commerce	CIBC	010	$59.31	$21.31	$5.00	48,074	

=== Big Six ===
National Bank of Canada, which began as a regional bank in Quebec but expanded nationally, is the sixth largest Canadian bank. In 2025, it acquired Canadian Western Bank. In 2022, Canada’s Big Six held about 93% of all banking assets in the country. It is the same share they held a decade earlier, and a decade before that. RBC’s $13.5-billion takeover of HSBC’s Canadian division, announced in November 2022, gave it around $134 billion in HSBC assets and increased the 93% share of assets the Big Six have to almost 95%.

Bank Name	Abbreviation	Institutional No.	Financial Metrics (2023, CAD, Billions)				Employees (FTE)	Source
Bank Name	Abbreviation	Institutional No.	Market capitalization	Revenue	Net income	Total assets	Employees (FTE)	Source
National Bank of Canada	NBC	006	$29.2	$10.2	$3.34	$424	31,243	

=== Other large banks (excluding Big Six) ===
Bank Name	Abbreviation	Institutional No.	Financial Metrics (2023, CAD, Billions)				Employees (FTE)	Source
Bank Name	Abbreviation	Institutional No.	Market capitalization	Revenue	Net income	Total assets	Employees (FTE)	Source
Equitable Bank	EQ Bank	623	$3.30	$0.785	$0.270	$103	1,685	

== Importance of Canada's financial institutions ==
=== Domestic systemically important bank (D-SIB) ===
A domestic systemically important bank (D-SIB) is a bank that could disrupt the domestic economy should it fail. Canada's Big Six are designated as D-SIBs. D-SIBs are so important to the functioning of the financial system and the economy, that they cannot be wound up under a conventional bankruptcy and liquidation process should they fail. The failure of any one of Canada’s D-SIBs, with the potential loss of financial services, even for a short period of time, could have a serious impact on Canada’s economy.

=== Desjardins ===
The Autorité des marchés financiers, which oversees Quebec’s financial sector, designated Desjardins Group as a D-SIB.

=== Global systemically important bank (G-SIB) ===
A global systemically important bank is a bank whose systemic risk profile is deemed to be of such importance that the bank’s failure would trigger a wider financial crisis and threaten the global economy. The Basel Committee has developed a formula for determining which banks are G-SIBs, deploying criteria including size, interconnectedness and complexity. National regulators subject banks determined to be G-SIBs to stricter prudential regulation such as higher capital requirements and extra surcharges, or more stringent stress tests.

In Canada, the Office of the Superintendent of Financial Institutions designated Royal Bank of Canada and Toronto-Dominion Bank as G-SIBs as well as D-SIBs.

=== Digital banking and fintech trends ===
In recent years, Canada has experienced a steady shift toward digital banking services, driven by changing consumer preferences and technological innovation. A growing share of Canadians now use digital-only banking platforms for at least part of their financial activities, reflecting increased demand for low-cost, mobile-first services.

Established banks have responded by expanding their digital offerings and investing in online infrastructure, while digital-first institutions such as Tangerine Bank and EQ Bank have gained traction through competitive pricing and simplified user experiences.

This trend is expected to accelerate alongside the development of open banking frameworks in Canada.

== Constitutional jurisdiction ==
Under the Canadian Constitution, the federal Parliament has exclusive jurisdiction over "Banking, Incorporation of Banks, and the Issue of Paper Money." It also has exclusive jurisdiction over "Savings Banks". That means that all banks are subject to exclusive federal regulation. Provinces do not have the authority to regulate banking.

The provinces do have jurisdiction to regulate other types of financial institutions, such as credit unions and trust companies.

== Banks by legal classification ==
Banks in Canada are classified by their ownership as domestic banks, subsidiaries of foreign banks, or branches of foreign banks. For a greater explanation of the classifications, see Banking in Canada and Bank Act (Canada).

=== Schedule I banks (domestic banks) ===
Under the Bank Act, Schedule I are banks that are not a subsidiary of a foreign bank, even if they have foreign shareholders. There are 34 domestic banks, including four federally regulated credit unions as of November 3, 2026.

Bank	Established	Headquarters	Ownership	Notes
B2B Bank	2012	Toronto	Acquired	Owned by Laurentian Bank of Canada and acquired by National Bank. Known as "B2B Trust" prior to reorganization in 2012.
Bank of Montreal	1817	Montreal	Public company, part of Big Six.	The operational headquarters and executive offices have been located in Toronto, Ontario since 1977
Bank of Nova Scotia	1832	Toronto	Public company, part of Big Six.	Operating as "Scotiabank".
Bridgewater Bank	1997	Calgary	Wholly owned subsidiary of the Alberta Motor Association (AMA)	
CS Alterna Bank	2000	Ottawa	Owned by the credit union Alterna Savings.	
Caisse populaire acadienne ltée (UNI)	1946	Caraquet, New Brunswick	Federal Credit Union, member owned.	On 1 July 2016, UNI Financial Cooperation became the first federally chartered credit union.
Canadian Imperial Bank of Commerce	1867	Toronto	Public company, part of Big Six.	Merged from Canadian Bank of Commerce (founded in 1867) and the Imperial Bank of Canada (founded in 1873). Also includes Simplii Financial direct banking branch operation that was found in the late 1990s as a strategic partnership between PC Financial and CIBC until its rebrand in 2017.
Canadian Tire Bank	2003	Oakville, Ontario	Owned by company Canadian Tire.	
Coast Capital Savings Federal Credit Union	1940	Surrey, British Columbia	Federal Credit Union, member owned.	From 17 October – 28 November 2016, a vote was held for members on whether or not Coast Capital Savings should become a federal credit union
Concentra Bank	2017	Saskatoon		Provides wholesale banking and trusts to Canada's credit union system. Bought by EQ Bank.
Digital Commerce Bank	2007	Calgary		Previously known as DirectCash Bank. Arms-length relationship with DirectCash Payments Inc.
Equitable Bank	2016	Toronto	Public company, regional bank.	Originally founded as a trust company named The Equitable Trust Company in Hamilton, Ontario in 1970. In 2013, the Equitable Trust Company was granted a Schedule I chartered bank license and became Equitable Bank. It launched a direct banking operation branded as EQ Bank in January 2016. In December 2025, Loblaw announced an agreement to sell PC Financial to EQ Bank.[38]
Exchange Bank of Canada	2016	Toronto	Subsidiary of Currency Exchange International Corp.	Provides foreign currency services to financial institutions and businesses.
Fairstone Bank of Canada	2009	Toronto		Incorporated as DuoBank under Schedule 2 (foreign-owned, deposit-taking) of the Bank Act in 2009; reclassified under Schedule 1 (domestic-owned, deposit-taking) following completion of the sale by Walmart Canada to First National co-founder Stephen Smith and private equity firm Centerbridge Equity Partners, L.P. in April 2019. DuoBank acquired Fairstone Financial Inc in 2021 and rebranded as Fairstone Bank of Canada in 2022.
First Nations Bank of Canada	1996	Saskatoon		First Canadian chartered bank to be independently controlled by Indigenous shareholders.
General Bank of Canada	2005	Edmonton		Schedule 1 bank that primarily offers indirect auto financing for consumers through its retail portfolio as well as large commercial loans and aviation financing.
Questbank	2025	Toronto	Owned by online brokerage firm and wealth management firm Questrade.	
Haventree Bank	2018	Toronto		Founded in 1990; private bank specializing in alternative mortgage programs and insured GIC deposits.
Home Bank	2015	Toronto	Owned by the trust company Home Trust Company.	Owns Oaken Financial, which are both owned by Home Capital Group. Home Bank began as CFF Bank, which was formed through acquisition of MonCana Bank by Canadian First Financial. CFF Bank became Home Bank in August 2016.
HomeEquity Bank	2009	Toronto	Privately held by Ontario Teachers Pension Plan - OTPP	Founded in 1986 as the Canadian Home Income Plan Corporation. HomeEquity Bank is the first Canadian bank to offer reverse mortgages to Canadian homeowners aged 55 and over. On 13 October 2009, HomeEquity Bank was recognized as a Schedule 1 Canadian Bank.
Innovation Federal Credit Union	2007	Swift Current	Federal Credit Union, member owned.	Received approval to begin operating as Innovation Federal Credit Union effective June 23, 2023.
Laurentian Bank of Canada	1846	Montreal	Acquired	Operates mainly in Quebec. As of December 2025, Fairstone Bank and National Bank will acquire its commercial and retail and small business operations.
Manulife Bank of Canada	1993	Toronto	Owned by the insurance company Manulife Financial Corporation.	
National Bank of Canada	1859	Montreal	Public company, part of Big Six.	Operates mainly in Quebec.
Peoples Bank of Canada	2020	Vancouver	Owned by the trust company Peoples Group.	
President's Choice Financial	1996	Toronto	Acquired	All PC Financial mortgages, loans, investments, and bank accounts were transferred to Simplii Financial in November 2017. PC Financial's credit card and insurance products were unaffected by the decision, and continued to be offered by subsidiaries of Loblaw Companies. In December 2025, Loblaw announced an agreement to sell PC Financial to EQ Bank.
RFA Bank of Canada	2017	Toronto		Previously known as Street Capital Bank of Canada. Granted schedule 1 status in December 2016. Commenced operations on 1 February 2017.
Rogers Bank	2013	Toronto	Owned by company Rogers Communications.	
Royal Bank of Canada	1864	Montreal	Public company, part of Big Six.	
Tangerine Bank	2013	Toronto	Owned by Scotiabank.	Formerly ING Direct Canada, purchased by Scotiabank in November 2012, and name was changed to Tangerine in spring 2014.
Toronto-Dominion Bank (The)	1855	Toronto	Public company, part of Big Six.	Operating as "TD Canada Trust". Formed by the merger of two banks founded in 1855 and 1869.
Tru Cooperative Bank	1946	Langley, British Columbia	Federal credit union, member owned.	Formerly named First West Credit Union. Became a federally regulated credit union and changed its name to Tru Cooperative Bank on April 1, 2026.
Vancity Community Investment Bank	1997	Vancouver	Owned by the credit union Vancity.	Previously known as Citizens Bank of Canada. Now a non-deposit taking bank; it no longer offers savings and loans products.
VersaBank	1980	London, Ontario	Public company, regional bank.	Originally founded as a trust company named Pacific & Western Trust Corporation in Saskatoon, Saskatchewan in 1980. It later moved its head offices to London, Ontario. On 1 August 2002, it was granted a Schedule I chartered bank licence and became Pacific & Western Trust Bank of Canada before finally changing its name to VersaBank in 2016.
Wealth One Bank of Canada	2015	Toronto		Focus on providing services to Chinese-Canadians. It provides banking services online and through retail offices in Toronto, Ontario, and in Vancouver, British Columbia.

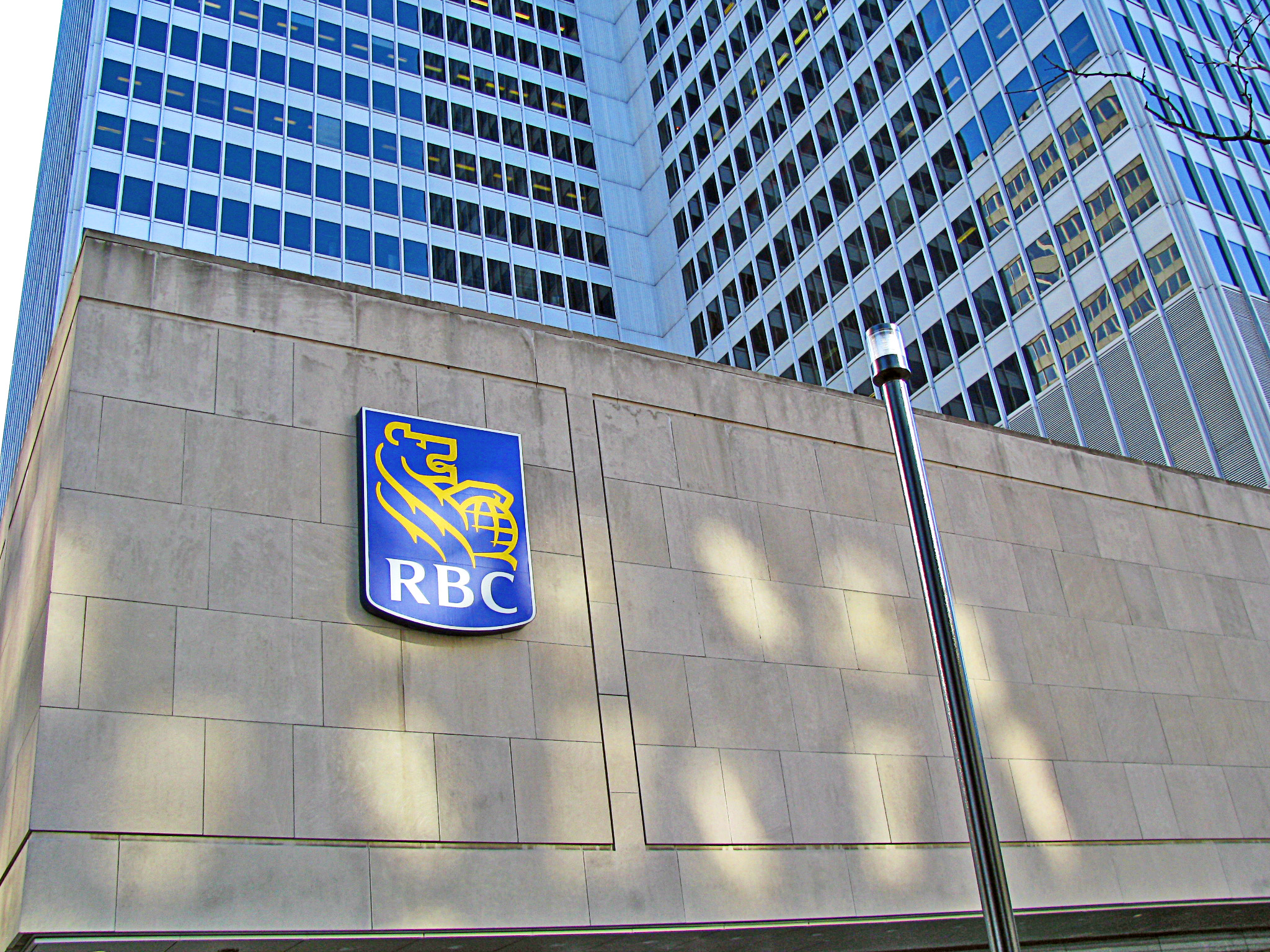
Place Ville-Marie is the home to the Montreal offices of the Royal Bank of Canada

=== Schedule II banks (subsidiaries of foreign banks) ===
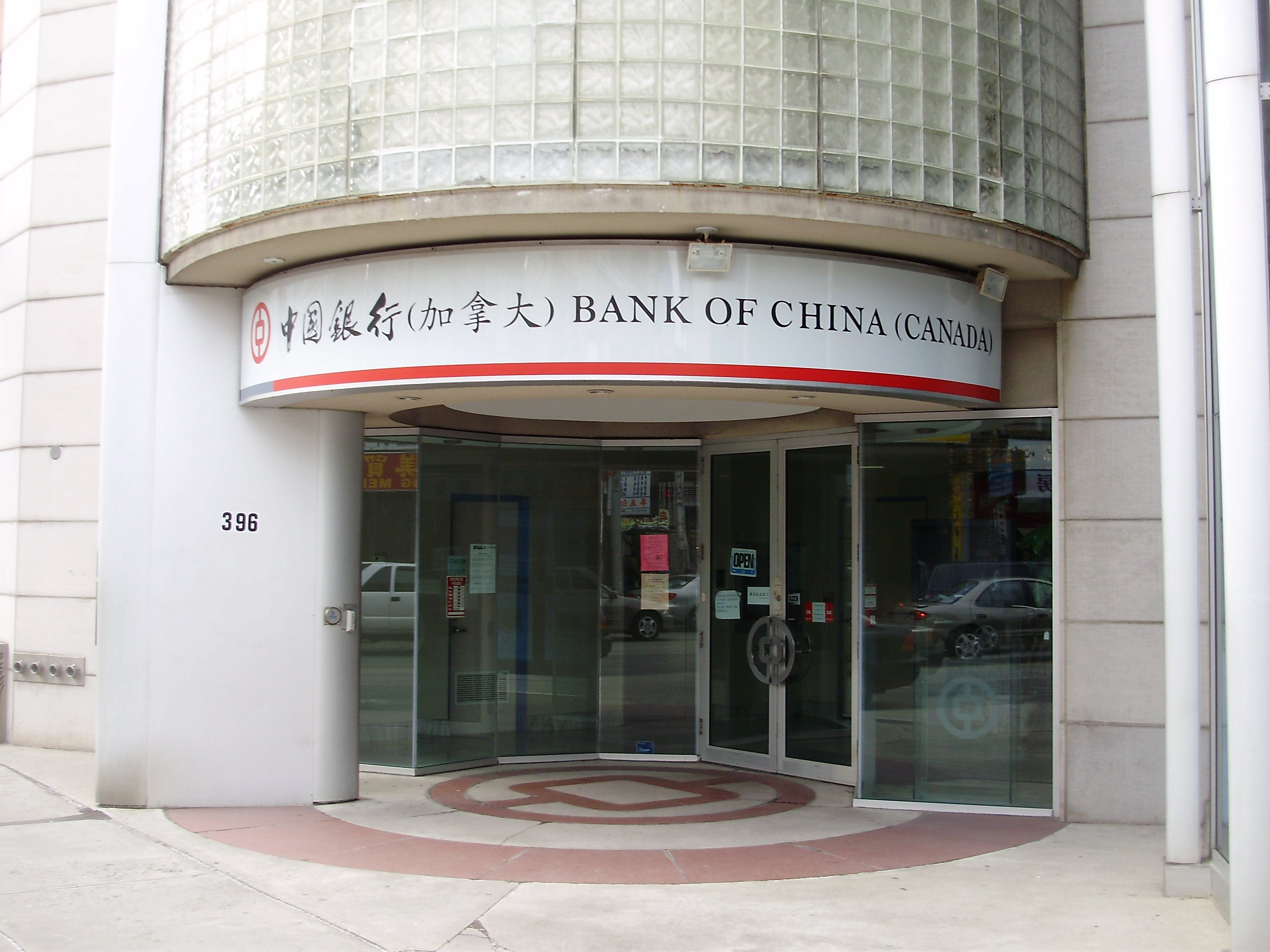
The Toronto branch of the Bank of China (Canada).

Schedule II banks are banks allowed to accept deposits and which are subsidiaries of a foreign bank. As of February 10th, 2026, there were 15 of these banks in Canada.

Bank	Parent Country	Notes
AMEX Bank of Canada	United States	
Bank of China (Canada)	China	Previously a Schedule III representative office.
CTBC Bank Corp. (Canada)	Taiwan	
Cidel Bank Canada	Barbados	
Citco Bank Canada	Netherlands	
Citibank Canada	USA	
Habib Canadian Bank	Switzerland	
ICICI Bank Canada	India	
Industrial and Commercial Bank of China (Canada)	China	
J.P. Morgan Bank Canada	United States	
KEB Hana Bank Canada	South Korea	Formerly Korea Exchange Bank of Canada.
SBI Canada Bank	India	
Santander Consumer Bank	Spain	
Shinhan Bank Canada	South Korea	
UBS Bank (Canada)	Switzerland	

=== Schedule III banks (branches of foreign banks) ===
==== Full service ====
The following banks are not authorized to accept deposits in Canada of less than $150,000. As of February 10th, 2026, there were 27 such banks in Canada.

Bank	Parent Country	Notes
BNP Paribas	France	
Bank of America, National Association	United States	
Bank of China Limited	China	
Bank of New York Mellon (The)	United States	
Barclays Bank PLC	UK	
Capital One, National Association	United States	
China Construction Bank	China	
Citibank, N.A.	United States	
Comerica Bank	United States	
Coöperatieve Rabobank U.A.	Netherlands	
Deutsche Bank AG	Germany	
Fifth Third Bank National Association	United States	
First Commercial Bank	Taiwan	
JPMorgan Chase Bank, National Association	United States	
M&T Bank	United States	
MUFG Bank, Ltd.	Japan	
Maple Bank GmbH	Germany	Holding group is based in Canada but chartered through a subsidiary German bank. In liquidation.
Mega International Commercial Bank Co., Ltd.	Taiwan	
Mizuho Bank, Ltd.	Japan	
Northern Trust Company (The)	United States	
PNC Bank, National Association	United States	
Société Générale	France	
State Street Bank and Trust Company	United States	
Sumitomo Mitsui Banking Corporation	Japan	
U.S. Bank National Association	United States	
United Overseas Bank Limited	Singapore	
Wells Fargo Bank, National Association	United States	

==== Lending only ====
The following banks are prohibited from accepting deposits or borrowing money except from financial institutions. There were four such banks in Canada as of May 2025.

- Crédit Agricole Corporate and Investment Bank (Canada Branch)
- Natixis Canada Branch

== Government-owned financial institutions ==
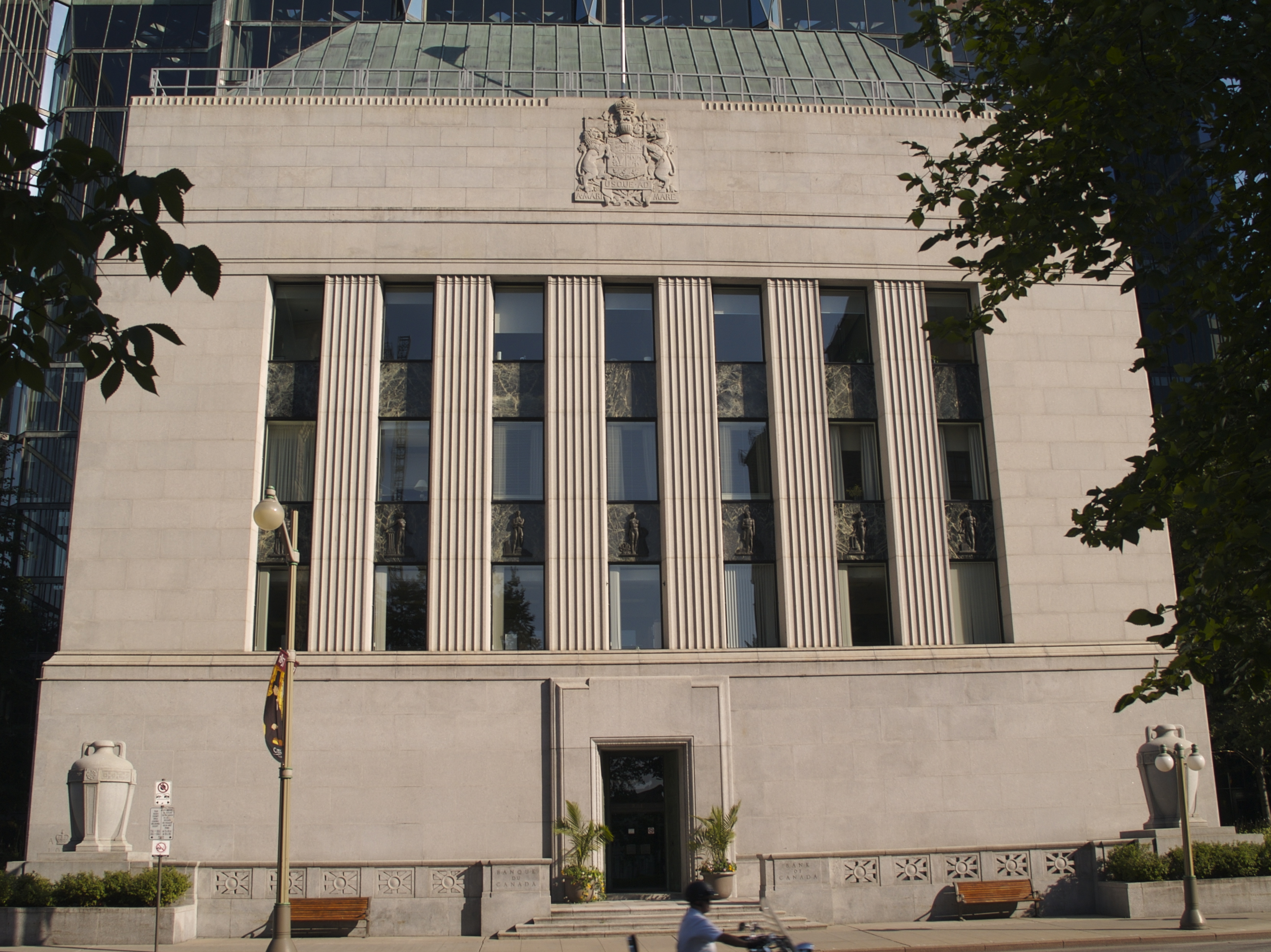
The Bank of Canada Building in Ottawa is the headquarters of the country's central bank.

- Bank of Canada (Central Bank)
- Business Development Bank of Canada
- Farm Credit Canada – Government-owned Farm Credit is not a deposit-taking bank. It is, however, a major lender to the agriculture and agri-food industries.
- ATB Financial (Government of Alberta Crown Corporation)

== Credit unions ==
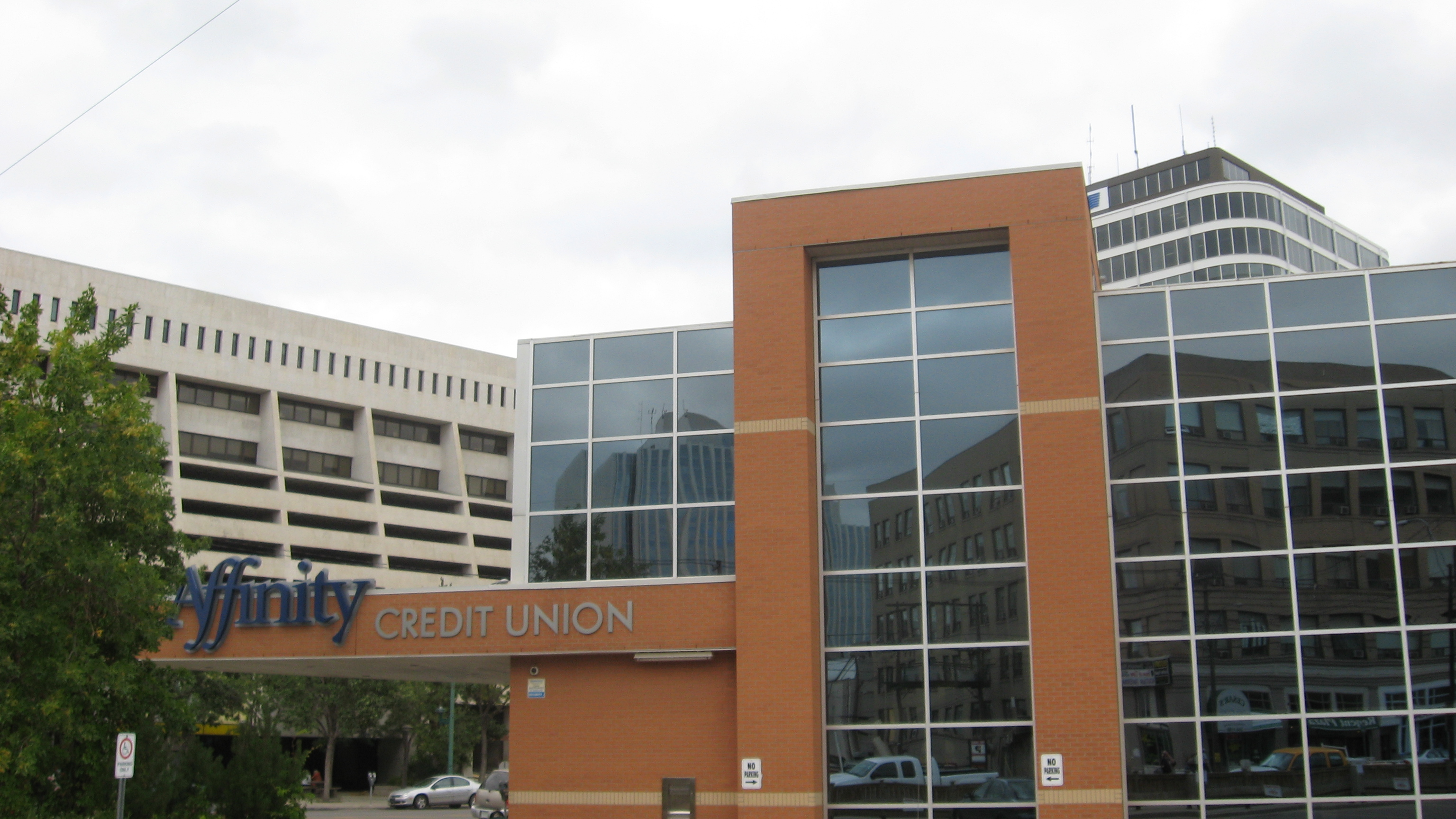
Branch of Affinity Credit Union in Saskatoon, Saskatchewan.

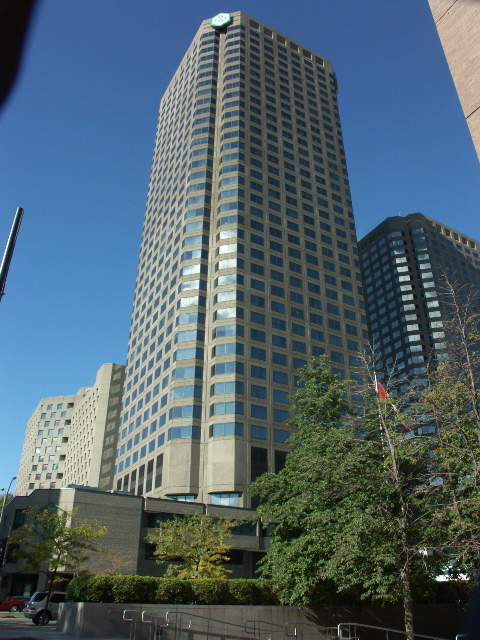
The executive headquarters of the Desjardins Group in Montreal.

Canada has a strong co-operative financial services sector, which consists of credit unions (caisses populaires in Quebec and other French speaking regions). At the end of 2001, Canada's credit union sector consisted of 681 credit unions and 914 caisses populaires, with more than 3,600 locations and 4,100 automated teller machines. By the end of 2019, consolidation reduced this number to 251 credits unions and caisses populaires outside Quebec, according to the Canadian Credit Union Association (CCUA). Canada has the world's highest per capita membership in the credit union movement, with over 10 million members, or about one-third of the Canadian population. While the sector is active in all parts of the country, it is strongest in the western provinces and in Quebec. In Quebec 70 per cent of the population belongs to a caisse populaire, while in Saskatchewan close to 60 per cent belongs to a credit union.

=== Credit unions outside Quebec ===
As of 31 December 2022, the 208 credit unions and caisses populaires outside Quebec reported combined assets of $308.9 billion:

Credit Union	Province	Assets	Members	Locations
Vancity	BC	28,298,424,745	535,155	54
Meridian Credit Union	ON	26,155,667,000	382,355	92
Coast Capital Savings	BC	22,130,514,640	597,681	45
Tru Cooperative Bank	BC	20,758,161,000	289,696	45
Servus Credit Union	AB	18,338,460,000	384,893	105
Access Credit Union	MB	10,759,971,657	177,605	54
Desjardins Ontario Credit Union	ON	10,756,224,987	134,541	46
Steinbach Credit Union	MB	9,123,840,600	106,173	3
Alterna Savings	ON	7,581,600,000	193,109	46
Affinity Credit Union	SK	7,226,192,926	129,541	56
ConnectFirst Credit Union	AB	7,216,582,000	132,410	44
DUCA Credit Union	ON	6,936,459,987	92,340	17
Prospera Credit Union	BC	6,935,325,000	116,353	26
Conexus Credit Union	SK	6,760,855,894	137,033	30
Assiniboine Credit Union	MB	6,108,445,485	141,475	19

=== Desjardins ===
Most credit unions in Quebec (and some outside the province) are part of a network which operates as the Desjardins Group. Desjardins Group owns and operates a range of subsidiaries, including a securities brokerage, a venture capital firm, and a bank based in Florida.

As of 25 December 2023, Desjardins Group's consolidated assets totalled $407 billion CAD.

Name	Institution No	Total assets (2023) (CAD) (Billions)	Employees (FTE)	Source
Desjardins	815	$407	58,774	

== Defunct and merged banks ==
Bank	Established	Defunct	Comments
Accommodation Bank of Kingston	1830s	?	Issued banknotes in the 1830s.
Agricultural Bank of Toronto	1834	1837	Founded as Truscott, Green & Company, a private bank, before renaming. Failed.
Amicus Bank	1999	2003	Dissolved into the Canadian Imperial Bank of Commerce
Arman's Bank of Montreal	1830s	?	Existed in the 1830s.
Bank of Acadia	1872	1873	Failed.
Bank of Alberta	1984	1988	Merged with the Western & Pacific Bank of Canada to become Canadian Western Bank.
Bank of Brantford	1850s	?	Issued banknotes in the 1850s.
Bank of British Columbia (1st)	1862	1901	Merged into the Canadian Bank of Commerce.
Bank of British Columbia (2nd)	1966	1986	Assets acquired by HSBC Canada.
Bank of British North America	1836	1918	Merged into the Bank of Montreal.
Bank of Canada (1st)	1818	1831	Merged into the Bank of Montreal.
Bank of Clifton	1859	1863	Reincarnation of Zimmerman Bank. Closed.
Bank of the County of Elgin	1855	1862	Closed.
Bank of Fredericton	1836	1839	Merged into the Commercial Bank of New Brunswick.
Bank of Hamilton	1872	1923	Merged into the Canadian Bank of Commerce in January 1924.
Bank of Liverpool	1871	1879	Closed 1873–1878, before final closure.
Bank of London	1883	1887	Merged into the Bank of Toronto.
Bank of Lower Canada	1839	1851	Closed.
Bank of New Brunswick	1820	1913	Merged into the Bank of Nova Scotia.
Bank of Ottawa	1874	1919	Merged into the Bank of Nova Scotia.
Bank of the People	1835	1840	Merged into the Bank of Montreal.
Bank of Prince Edward Island	1856	1881	Failed.
Bank of Toronto	1855	1955	Operated as The Millers Association of Canada West before reorganizing as the Bank of Toronto in 1855. Merged with The Dominion Bank to form the Toronto-Dominion Bank.
Bank of Upper Canada	1821	1866	Chartered in 1821. Opened in 1822. Failed in 1866.
Bank of Vancouver	1908	1914	Organized in 1908. Opened in 1910. Failed in 1914.
Bank of Victoria	1830s	?	Existed in 1836 and at least until 1875.
Bank of Western Canada	1859	1863	Closed.
Bank of Yarmouth	1859	1905	Failed.
Banque De Boucherville	1830s	?	Issued banknotes in the 1830s.
Banque Canadienne Nationale	1924	1979	Merged in 1979 with Provincial Bank of Canada to become National Bank of Canada.
Banque d'Hochelaga	1874	1924	Merged with the Banque Nationale to form the Banque Canadienne Nationale.
Banque Nationale	1859	1924	Chartered in 1859. Merged with the Banque d'Hochelaga to form the Banque Canadienne Nationale.
Banque du Peuple	1835	1895	Failed.
Banque de St. Hyacinthe	1873	1908	Failed.
Banque Internationale du Canada	1911	1913	Merged into the Home Bank of Canada.
Banque de St. Jean	1873	1908	Failed.
Banque Ville-Marie	1872	1899	Failed.
Barclays Bank Canada	1929	1956	Merged into Imperial Bank of Canada in 1956 and Hongkong Bank of Canada, now known as HSBC Bank Canada, in 1996.
British Canadian Bank	1882	1884	Incorporated as the North-Western Bank. Changed name in 1883. Closed.
Canadian Bank of Commerce	1867	1961	Merged with the Imperial Bank of Canada to form the Canadian Imperial Bank of Commerce.
Canadian Western Bank	1988	2025	Acquired by National Bank of Canada in 2025
Canadian Commercial Bank	1976	1985	Failed
Central Bank of Canada	1883	1887	Failed.
Central Bank of New Brunswick	1834	1866	Failed.
Charlotte County Bank	1825	1865	Failed.
City Bank of Montreal	1833	1876	Merged with the Royal Canadian Bank to form the Consolidated Bank of Canada.
City Bank of St. John	1836	1839	Merged into the Bank of New Brunswick.
Colonial Bank of Canada	1856	1863	Only operated in 1859, before it failed.
Commercial Bank of Canada	1831	1868	Founded in 1831 as the Commercial Bank of the Midland District, the name changed to the Commercial Bank of Canada in 1856. Merged with the Merchants Bank in Montreal to form the Merchants' Bank of Canada.
Commercial Bank of Manitoba	1885	1893	Failed.
Commercial Bank of Montreal	1835	1837	Failed.
Commercial Bank of New Brunswick	1834	1868	Failed.
Commercial Bank of Newfoundland	1857	1894	Failed.
Commercial Bank of Windsor	1864	1902	Merged into the Union Bank of Halifax.
Consolidated Bank of Canada	1876	1879	Failed.
Continental Bank of Canada	1980	1986	Acquired by Lloyds Bank and became Lloyds Bank Canada.
Crown Bank of Canada	1904	1908	Merged with the Northern Bank to form the Northern Crown Bank.
Dominion Bank	1869	1955	Established in 1869. Opened in 1871. Merged with the Bank of Toronto in 1955 to form the Toronto-Dominion Bank.
Eastern Bank of Canada	1928	1934	Failed.
Eastern Townships Bank	1855	1912	Merged into the Canadian Bank of Commerce.
Exchange Bank of Canada (1st)	1872	1883	Failed.
Exchange Bank of Toronto	1855	1858	Founded in 1855 as the Banking House of R.H. Brett, the name changed to the Exchange Bank of Toronto in 1856. Closed in 1858.
Exchange Bank of Yarmouth	1867	1903	Merged into the Bank of Montreal.
Farmers Bank of Canada	1906	1910	Failed.
Farmers' Bank of Malden	1840s	1840s	Failed.
Farmers' Bank of Rustico	1862	1894	Failed.
Farmer's Joint Stock Bank	1835	1854	Failed.
Federal Bank of Canada	1874	1888	Failed.
Goderich Bank	1834	1834	Closed.
Gore Bank of Hamilton	1835	1870	Merged into the Canadian Bank of Commerce.
Grenville County Bank	1850s	?	Issued banknotes in the 1850s.
Halifax Banking Company	1825	1903	Merged into the Canadian Bank of Commerce.
Hart's Bank	1835	1847	Closed.
Henry's Bank	1837	1837	Failed.
Home Bank of Canada	1903	1923	Incorporated in 1903. Opened in 1904. Failed in 1923.
Home District Savings Bank, Toronto	1830	1837	Founded 1830 for trades persons with deposits with Bank of Upper Canada but was alternative to those not aligned with the Family Compact which controlled the Bank of Upper Canada. Ceased to exist sometime after the Rebellion of 1837.
Imperial Bank of Canada	1873	1961	Merged with Canadian Bank of Commerce to form the Canadian Imperial Bank of Commerce (CIBC).
International Bank of Canada	1858	1859	Failed.
Lloyds Bank Canada	1986	1990	Became Hongkong Bank of Canada, now known as HSBC Bank Canada in 1990.
Macdonald and Company	1859	1864	Failed.
The Maritime Bank of the Dominion of Canada	1872	1887	Failed.
Mercantile Bank of Canada	1953	1985	Merged into the National Bank of Canada.
Mechanics Bank of Montreal	1865	1879	Failed.
Mercantile Banking Corporation	1870s	?	Issued banknotes in the 1870s.
Merchants Bank of Canada	1868	1923	Failing in 1921, taken over by the Bank of Montreal in 1922, and merger completed in 1923.
Merchants' Bank of Halifax	1864	1901	Merged into the Royal Bank of Canada.
Merchants Bank in Montreal	1864	1868	Merged with the Commercial Bank of Canada to form the Merchants Bank of Canada.
Merchants' Bank of Montreal	1830s	?	Issued banknotes in the 1830s.
Merchants Bank of Prince Edward Island	1871	1906	Merged into the Canadian Bank of Commerce.
Metropolitan Bank of Montreal	1871	1876	Failed.
Metropolitan Bank of Toronto	1902	1914	Merged into the Bank of Nova Scotia.
Molsons Bank	1837	1925	Merged into the Bank of Montreal.
Montreal City and District Savings Bank			Converted from a savings bank to a regular bank and changed its name to Laurentian Bank of Canada.
Motus Bank	2019	2025	Dissolved in October 2025. Deposits transferred to Coast Capital Savings. Most of the lendings in Ontario transferred to erstwhile parent Meridian Credit Union; rest of the lendings in Ontario and all of the lendings outside Ontario are transferred to Coast Capital Savings
National Westminster Bank of Canada	1982	1998	Became Hongkong Bank of Canada, now known as HSBC Bank Canada in 1998.
Newcastle Banking Company	1830s	?	Issued banknotes in the 1830s.
Newcastle District Loan Company	1830s	?	Issued banknotes in the 1830s.
Newfoundland Savings Bank	1834	1962	Merged into the Bank of Montreal.
Niagara District Bank	1853	1875	Merged into the Imperial Bank of Canada.
Niagara Suspension Bridge Bank	1836	1841	Closed.
Northern Bank	1905	1908	Merged with the Crown Bank of Canada to form the Northern Crown Bank.
Northern Crown Bank	1908	1918	Merged into the Royal Bank of Canada.
Northland Bank	1974	1985	Failed
Ontario Bank	1857	1906	Merged into the Bank of Montreal.
Peoples Bank of Halifax	1864	1905	Merged into the Bank of Montreal.
Peoples Bank of New Brunswick	1864	1907	Merged into the Bank of Montreal.
Pictou Bank of Nova Scotia	1873	1887	Closed.
Provincial Bank of Canada	1861	1979	Founded as la Banque Jacques Cartier, before renaming in 1900 as la Banque Provinciale du Canada in 1900. Merged with Banque Canadienne Nationale to become National Bank of Canada.
Provincial Bank of Canada in Stanstead	1856	1863	Closed.
Quebec Bank	1818	1917	Merged into the Royal Bank of Canada.
Royal Canadian Bank	1864	1876	Merged with the City Bank to form the Consolidated Bank of Canada.
St. Stephen's Bank	1836	1910	Merged into the Bank of British North America.
Sovereign Bank of Canada	1901	1908	Failed.
Stadacona Bank	1874	1879	Failed.
Standard Bank of Canada	1872	1928	Founded as the St. Lawrence Bank, before renaming in 1876. Merged into Canadian Bank of Commerce.
Standard Chartered Bank of Canada	1969	1990s	
Sterling Bank of Canada	1905	1924	Merged into Standard Bank of Canada.
Summerside Bank	1866	1901	Merged into the Bank of New Brunswick.
Traders Bank of Canada	1885	1912	Acquired by the Royal Bank of Canada.
Union Bank of Canada	1865	1925	Founded as the Union Bank of Lower Canada, the name changed to the Union Bank of Canada in 1886. Merged into the Royal Bank of Canada.
Union Bank of Halifax	1856	1910	Merged into the Royal Bank of Canada.
Union Bank of Montreal	1830s	1840s	Founded as the Union Bank, the name changed to the Union Bank of Montreal about 1841. Closed.
Union Bank of Newfoundland	1854	1894	Failed.
Union Bank of Prince Edward Island	1860	1883	Merged into the Bank of Nova Scotia.
United Empire Bank of Canada	1906	1911	Founded as the Pacific Bank of Canada before renaming in 1906. Merged into the Union Bank of Canada.
Unity Bank of Canada	1972	1977	Failed and merged into the Provincial Bank of Canada.
Western and Pacific Bank of Canada	1982	1988	Merged with the Bank of Alberta to form the Canadian Western Bank.
Western Bank of Canada	1882	1909	Merged into the Standard Bank of Canada.
Westmorland Bank	1854	1867	Failed.
Weyburn Security Bank	1910	1931	Merged into the Imperial Bank of Canada.
Zimmerman Bank of Elgin	1854	1859	Reestablished as the Bank of Clifton.

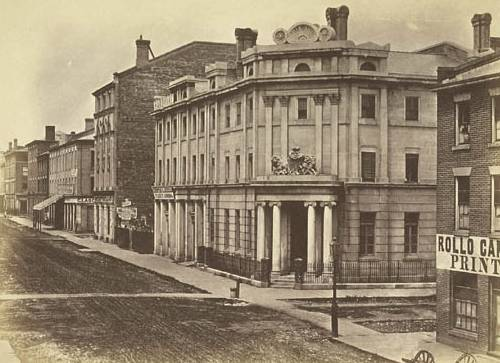
The Bank of British North America, on Yonge Street in Toronto.

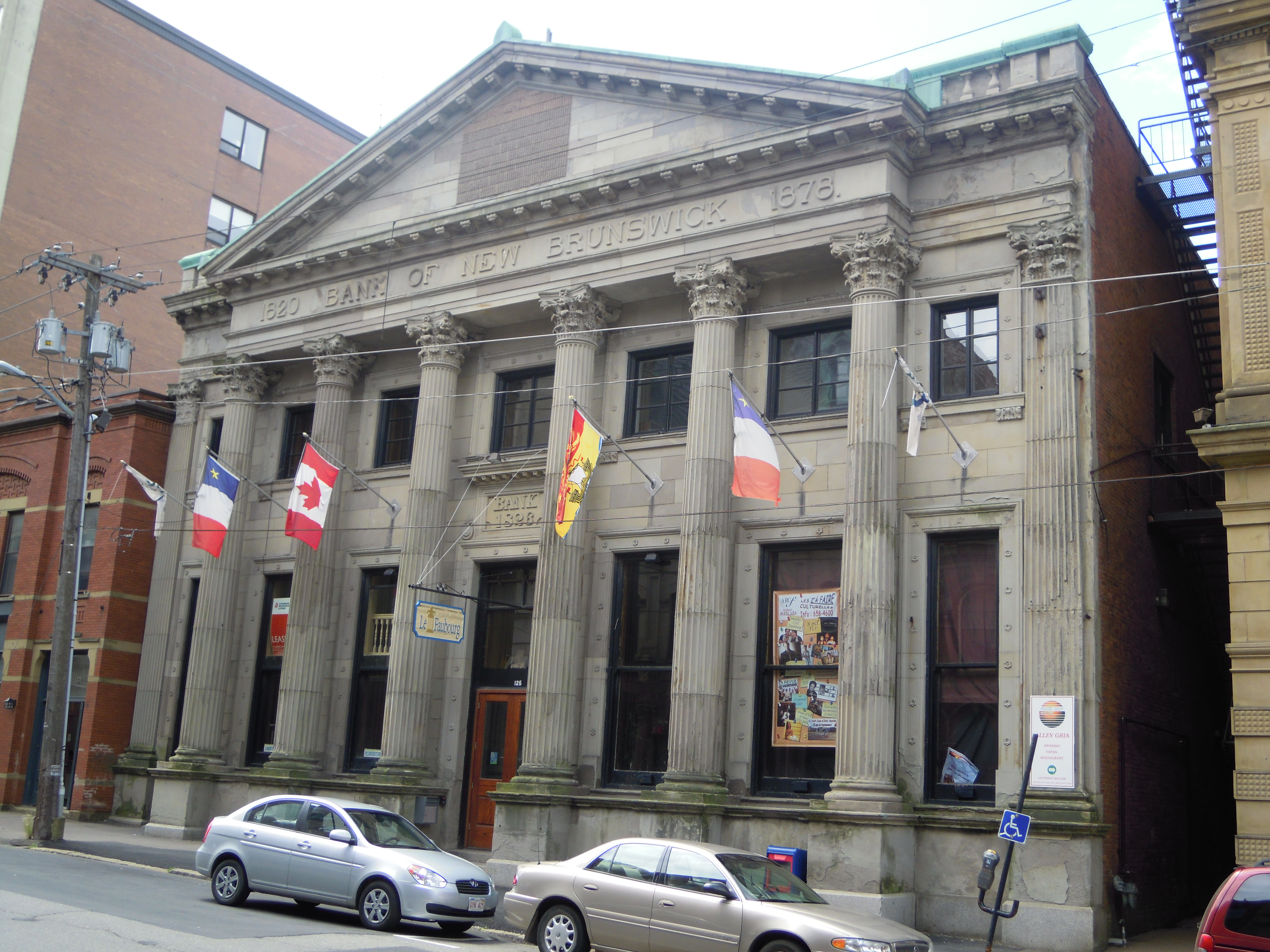
The former Bank of New Brunswick Building in Saint John.

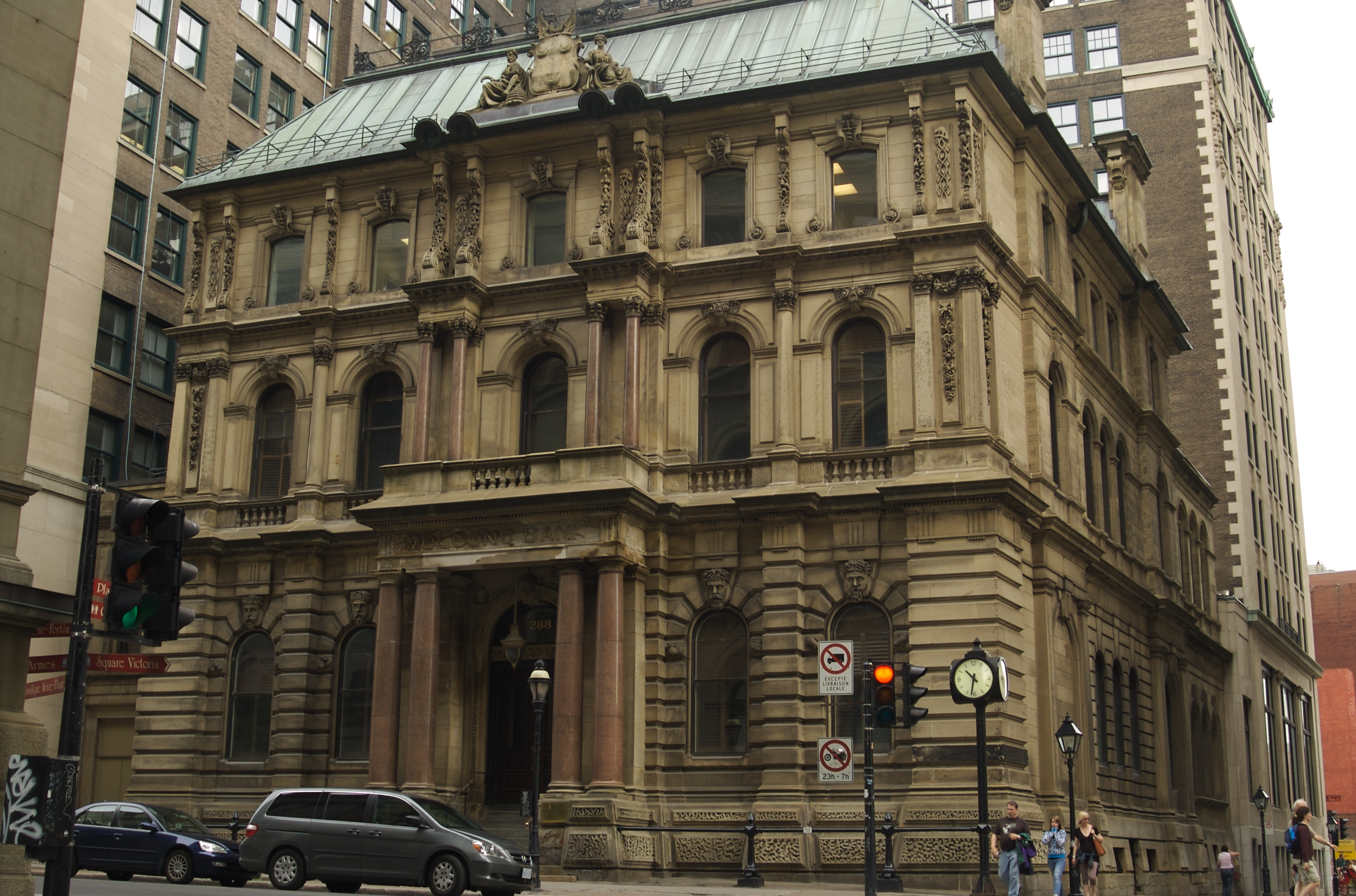
Former Molson Bank head office, Montreal

== Credit agencies ==
- Equifax Canada
- TransUnion Canada

== See also ==
- List of trust and loan companies in Canada
- List of insurance companies in Canada
- Banking in Canada
- Credit unions in Canada
- Canada Deposit Insurance Corporation
- Routing number (Canada)
- Canada Bank Company
- ATB Financial
