= Banking in Canada =

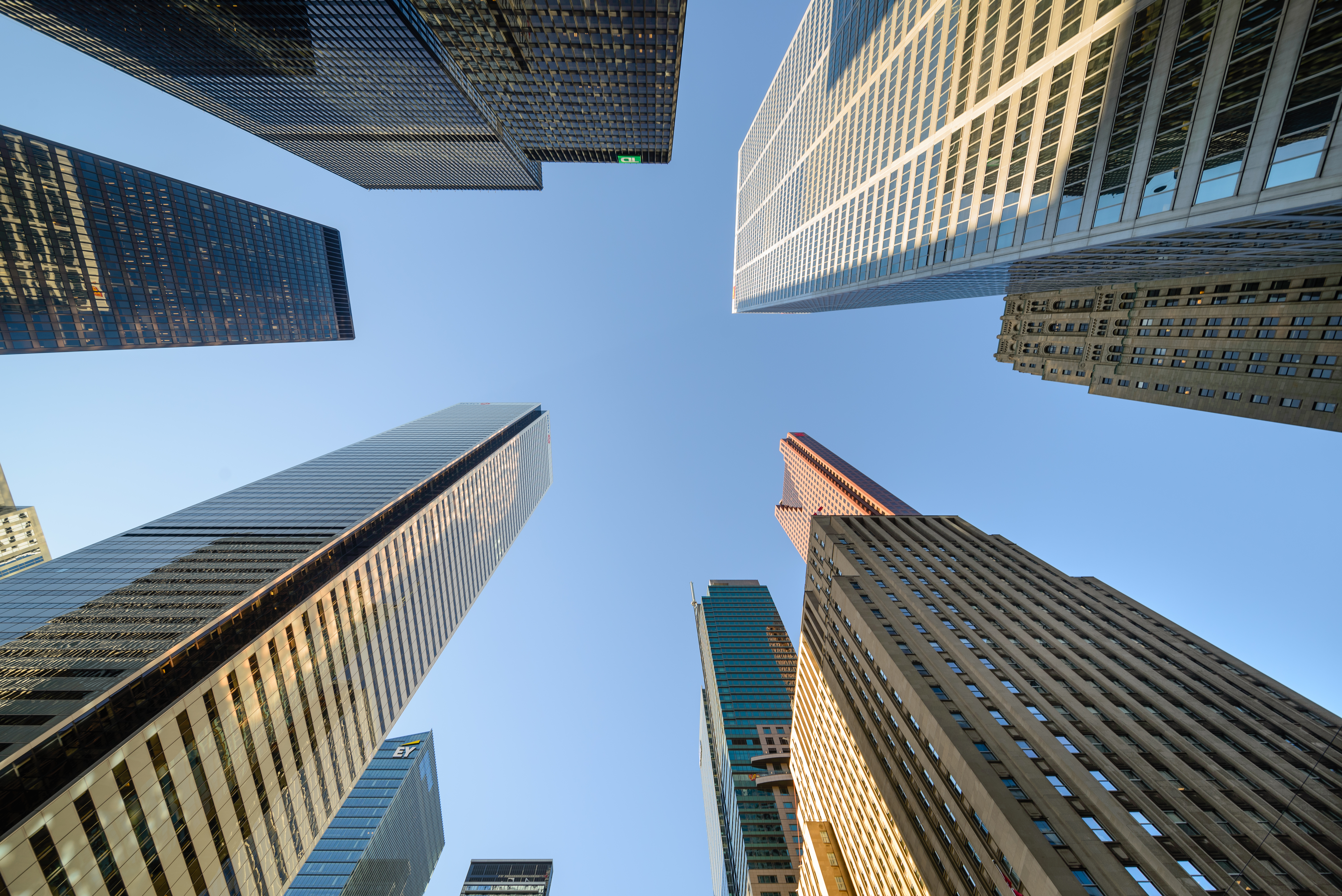
The towers at Bay and King Street in Toronto are home to four of Canada's five largest banks.

The banking sector of Canada is a large component of the nation's private sector and the broader Canadian economy. It is dominated by a small number of large banks, with the six largest combining for 93% of the banking assets. The two largest, the Royal Bank of Canada and the Toronto Dominion Bank are among the world's 25 largest banks. It has been considered to be one of the safest and soundest banking systems in the world.

Canada's banks have high service levels and investments in technology. A report released by the office of the Minister of Finance in 2002 states "Canada has the highest number of ATMs per capita in the world and benefits from the highest penetration levels of electronic channels such as debit cards, Internet banking and telephone banking". More recent data published by the World Bank shows that as of 2017 Canada has 227.82 ATMs per 100,000 adults, which ranks the country third worldwide.

== History ==
=== New France ===
The earliest history of traditional banking in Canada can be traced to New France, where playing cards were issued as a method of payment in the 1680s by the Intendant of New France, in addition to the coins introduced in the 1660s. The massive drain of wealth from New France to Europe resulting from mercantilist trade policies made it impossible to back card money with gold bullion. Card money was thus essentially worthless. The card system collapsed in the 1690s, causing long-term suspicion of paper money on the part of the French settlers.

Card money was replaced in the 18th century by a type of promissory note called bons, derived from the French phrase, bon pour, meaning "good for the indicated amount". These were issued to a limited extent by French merchants, who, lacking in any other form of currency, were forced to create their own, and who consequently became the first Canadian bankers. The issue of bons spread rapidly into British North America after 1763, when New France became a British possession.

=== British era ===
Bons persisted as the most common type of currency until 1812, along with the English pound, American and Spanish coinage, and the Halifax standard.

The British administration under Isaac Brock introduced what became known as army bills in 1812, in order to finance the War of 1812. The total value of these bills was 250,000 pounds. These were promissory notes issued directly by the government. They came into wide usage during the war (1812–1815) to make up for the lack of bullion in Upper and Lower Canada. Unlike the card money used in the late 17th century, army bills could be and were in fact exchanged for gold coin once the war had ended. The army bills had thus proven themselves reliable, eradicating any real stigma against paper currency.

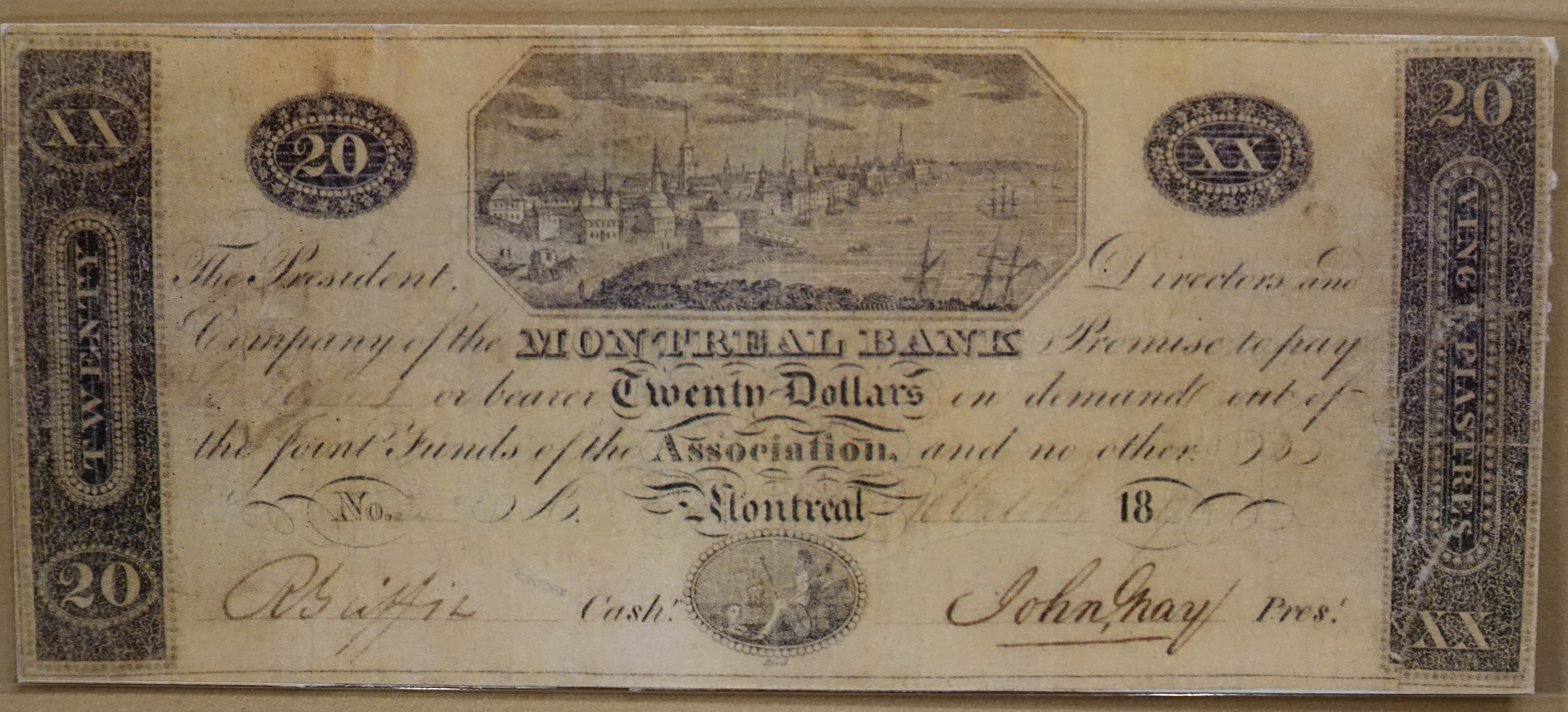
20 dollar note, Bank of Montreal, 1817

In 1817, Montreal bankers were granted a charter by the British government to open the first formal bank in Canada. This was the Bank of Montreal. Under its charter, the Bank of Montreal was given a monopoly on the right to issue promissory notes on the model of the army bills. Because of its monopoly rights, the Bank of Montreal essentially acted as a central bank for both Upper and Lower Canada.

In the years after 1817, Britain granted several new bank charters, including a charter to the now-defunct Bank of Kingston, which was to act as a competitor to the Bank of Montreal in Upper Canada. The new chartered banks were required under the terms of their charters to recognise one another's currency, a practice that allowed for the development of long-distance trade within British North America. However, banking remained in private hands, which meant that the issue of currency was at the discretion of private bankers. This frequently led to high inflation when the infant Canadian economy was in recession.

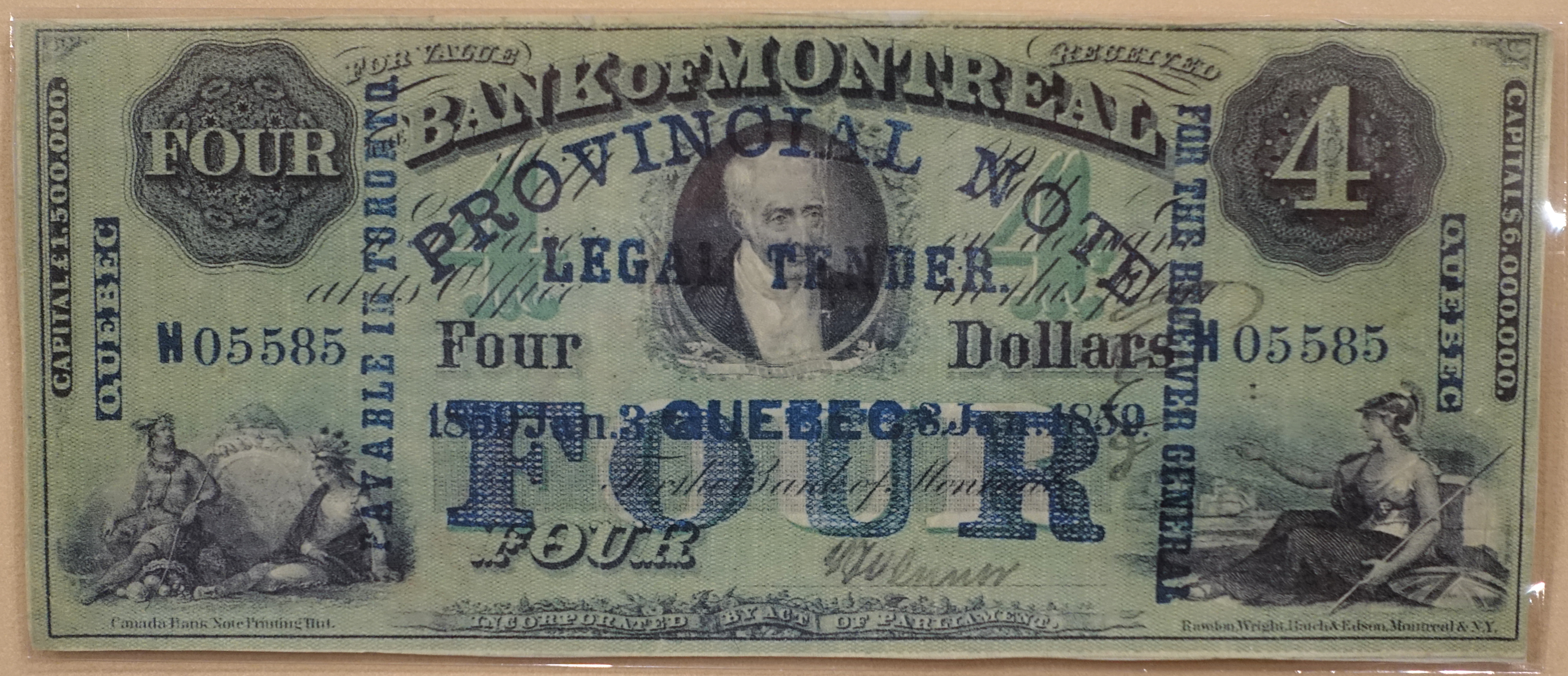
4 Dollars, Bank of Montreal, overprinted as provincial note

=== Confederation ===
The Provincial Note Act was passed in 1866 to link the issuance of government notes to the needs of the British administration. This marked the beginning of an enduring policy of government intervention in the Canadian economy. The British North America Act 1867 formally codified this policy, allowing for government control over coinage, currency, bills of exchange, promissory notes, banking, and incorporation of banks. This in turn allowed for the creation of a uniform currency across Canada. Official Canadian currency took the form of the Canadian dollar in 1871, overriding the currency of individual banks.

After Confederation, Canada developed a banking system very different from that of the United States. Whereas the United States was served a large number of small banks serving just one town or, at most state, Canada's banking sector came to be dominated by a few banks with transcontinental branch networks. The Canadian system promoted stability and produced far fewer bank failures than either the contemporary United States or Australian banking systems. The downside of the Canadian banking system was that it was much less competitive that the United States and Australian systems, which meant that consumers paid more for banking services. The legal foundation of the Canadian banking system consisted of a series of laws passed in 1870 and 1871.

Banking remained relatively decentralized until 1935, when the Bank of Canada was founded in response to the economic instability experienced during the Great Depression in Canada. First opened on December 5, 1980, Canada's Currency Museum is located on the ground floor of the Bank of Canada in Ottawa, Ontario.

== Ranking with other countries ==
A survey conducted by the World Economic Forum called the Global Competitiveness Report of twelve-thousand corporate executives, in 2008, concluded that Canada has the best banking system in the world, receiving a score of 6.8 out of possible seven. The Canadian banking system has long been regarded by industry experts to be one of the strongest and most stable banking systems in the world.

The Bank of Montreal has been paying dividends to share holders every year since 1829 (197 years ago), Scotiabank since 1833 (193 years ago), Toronto-Dominion Bank since 1857 (169 years ago), Canadian Imperial Bank of Commerce since 1868 (158 years ago) and Royal Bank of Canada since 1870 (156 years ago) respectively.

== Bank failures ==
In Canada, the Home Bank of Canada failed in 1923. Banking regulations were augmented, and since then only two small regional banks have failed. These were the Canadian Commercial Bank and the Northland Bank, which both failed in September 1985. There were no bank failures in Canada during the Great Depression, World War II, the 1979 Energy Crisis, the Dot-com Bubble, the Sept 11th Attacks or the Subprime Mortgage Crisis.

On June 4, 1996, the Calgary-based Security Home Mortgage Corporation closed its doors for good. About 2,600 Canadians discovered that their savings were not immediately available from their financial institution, in which they had entrusted a total of $42 million in deposits.

== Regulation ==
Canada's federal government has sole jurisdiction for banks according to the Canadian Constitution, specifically Section 91(15) of the Constitution Act, 1867 (30 & 31 Vict., c.3 (UK)), formerly known as the British North America Act, 1867. Meanwhile, credit unions/caisses populaires, securities dealers and mutual funds are largely regulated by provincial governments.

The main federal statute for the incorporation and regulation of banks, or chartered banks, is the Bank Act (S.C. 1991, c.46), where Schedules I, II and III of this Act list all banks permitted to operate in Canada under these three distinct categories:

- Schedule I: Banks allowed to accept deposits and which are not subsidiaries of a foreign bank. Examples include "The Big Five" banks (as mentioned below); associated brands of the Big Five such as Tangerine and Simplii Financial; and smaller second-tier banks such as National Bank of Canada, and Laurentian Bank of Canada. Because the Schedule I banks are not subsidiaries of any foreign bank, they are the true domestic banks and are the only banks allowed to receive, hold and enforce a special security interest described and provided for under the Bank Act and known to Canadian lawyers and bankers as the "Bank Act security".
- Schedule II: Banks allowed to accept deposits and which are subsidiaries of a foreign bank. Examples include AMEX Bank of Canada, Bank of China (Canada), Citibank Canada, HSBC Bank Canada, ICICI Bank Canada and Walmart Canada Bank. Like the Schedule I banks, the Schedule II banks are incorporated under the Bank Act.
- Schedule III: Foreign banks permitted to carry on business in Canada. Examples include Citibank N.A., Bank of America, Capital One, Credit Suisse and Deutsche Bank AG. Unlike the Schedule I and Schedule II banks, the Schedule III banks are NOT incorporated under the Bank Act and they operate in Canada, usually within the country's largest cities (being Toronto, Montreal, Calgary and Vancouver), under certain restrictions mentioned in the Bank Act.

The bank regulator is the Office of the Superintendent of Financial Institutions (best known as OSFI), whose authority stems from the Bank Act. The financial groups are also governed by regulatory bodies (bank regulators, securities regulators, insurance regulators, etc.) in each country in which they operate.

== Largest banks ==
=== Big Five ===
The top five Canadian banks are collectively referred to as the "Big Five" due to their dominant position and significant influence within the country's banking and financial industry. This term has been used for many years to characterize these major banks, and it highlights their substantial market share and impact on Canada's economy. The financial sector of Canada is especially concentrated in these banks, which has been seen as a result of protectionist policies of the government and the country's small and dispersed population. These banks grew at an extraordinary rate of 10.7 percent per year, on average, from 2008 to 2018 compared with 3.64 percent for the five largest U.S. banks. While most Canadian banks operate only within Canada, the Big Five are best described as Canadian multinational financial conglomerates that each have a large Canadian banking division.

| Name | Corporate Headquarters | Head Office | Market capitalization (2023) (CAD) (Billions) | Revenue (2023) (CAD) (Billions) | Net income (2023) (CAD) (Billions) | Employees (FTE) | Ref. |
|---|---|---|---|---|---|---|---|
| Royal Bank of Canada | Toronto, Ontario | Montreal, Quebec | $187.21 | $53.66 | $14.86 | 95,000+ | |
| Toronto-Dominion Bank | Toronto, Ontario | Toronto, Ontario | $154.21 | $49.20 | $10.78 | 103,257 | |
| Bank of Montreal | Toronto, Ontario | Montreal, Quebec | $93.86 | $29.02 | $4.37 | 55,767 | |
| Scotiabank | Toronto, Ontario | Toronto, Ontario | $76.32 | $29.25 | $7.41 | 89,483 | |
| Canadian Imperial Bank of Commerce | Toronto, Ontario | Toronto, Ontario | $59.31 | $21.31 | $5.00 | 48,074 | |

=== Big Six ===
When people talk about Canada's Big Six banks, they are including National Bank of Canada, which following its merger with Canadian Western Bank has a national footprint. Despite being a multi-regional player, National Bank is the country's sixth-largest bank.

| Name | Corporate Headquarters | Head Office | Market capitalization (2023) (CAD) (Billions) | Revenue (2023) (CAD) (Billions) | Net income (2023) (CAD) (Billions) | Total assets (2023) (CAD) (Billions) | Employees (FTE) | Ref. |
|---|---|---|---|---|---|---|---|---|
| National Bank of Canada | Montreal, Quebec | Montreal, Quebec | $29.2 | $10.2 | $3.34 | $424 | 31,243 | |

=== Other large banks (excluding Big Six) ===
| Name | Corporate Headquarters | Head Office | Market capitalization (2023) (CAD) (Billions) | Revenue (2023) (CAD) (Billions) | Net income (2023) (CAD) (Millions) | Total assets (2023) (CAD) (Billions) | Employees (FTE) | Ref. |
|---|---|---|---|---|---|---|---|---|
| Equitable Bank | Toronto, Ontario | Toronto, Ontario | $3.30 | $0.785 | $270 | $103 | 1,685 | |

== Importance of Canada's financial institutions ==
=== Domestic systemically important bank (D-SIB) ===
A domestic systemically important bank (D-SIB) is a bank that could disrupt the domestic economy should it fail. Canada's Big Six are designated as D-SIBs. D-SIBs are so important to the functioning of the financial system and the economy that they cannot be wound up under a conventional bankruptcy and liquidation process should they fail. The failure of any one of Canada's D-SIBs, with the potential loss of financial services, even for a short period of time, could have a serious impact on Canada's economy.

=== Desjardins ===
The Autorité des marchés financiers, which oversees Quebec's financial sector, designated Desjardins Group as a D-SIB.

=== Global systemically important bank (G-SIB) ===
A global systemically important bank is bank whose systemic risk profile is deemed to be of such importance that the bank's failure would trigger a wider financial crisis and threaten the global economy. The Basel Committee has developed a formula for determining which banks are G-SIBs, deploying criteria including size, interconnectedness and complexity. National regulators subject banks determined to be G-SIBs to stricter prudential regulation such as higher capital requirements and extra surcharges, or more stringent stress tests.

In Canada, the Office of the Superintendent of Financial Institutions designated Royal Bank of Canada and Toronto-Dominion Bank as G-SIBs as well as D-SIBs.

== Business lines of banks ==
While most Canadian banks operate only within Canada, the Big Five are best described as Canadian multinational financial conglomerates that each have a large Canadian banking division. In fiscal 2007, RBC's Canadian segment called "Personal Financial Services" (the segment most related to what was traditionally thought of as retail banking) had revenue of only CAD$5,082 million (or 22.6%) of a total revenue of CAD$22,462 million. Canadian retail operations of the Big Five comprise other activities that do not need to be operated from a regulated bank. These other activities include mutual funds, insurance, credit cards, and brokerage activities. In addition, they have large international subsidiaries. The Canadian banking operations of the Big Five are largely conducted out of each parent company, unlike U.S. banks that use a holding company structure to hold their primary retail banking subsidiaries.

| Name | Canadian Retail Banking | Canadian Direct Banking | Canadian Brokerage | US Retail Banking | Private Banking | Investment Bank | Ref. |
|---|---|---|---|---|---|---|---|
| Royal Bank of Canada | RBC Royal Bank | | RBC Direct Investing | RBC Bank; City National Bank | RBC Wealth Management | RBC Capital Markets | |
| Toronto-Dominion Bank | TD Canada Trust | | TD Direct Investing (Division of TD Waterhouse) | TD Bank | TD Wealth Private Investment Advice (Division of TD Waterhouse) | TD Securities | |
| Bank of Montreal | BMO Bank of Montreal | | BMO InvestorLine Self-Directed | BMO Harris Bank | BMO Private Wealth | BMO Capital Markets | |
| Scotiabank | Scotiabank | Tangerine | Scotia iTRADE | Scotiabank | Scotia Wealth Management | Scotia Capital (Division of Scotiabank Global Banking and Markets) | |
| Canadian Imperial Bank of Commerce | CIBC | Simplii Financial | CIBC Investor's Edge | CIBC Bank USA | CIBC Private Wealth | CIBC Capital Markets | |
| National Bank of Canada | NBC | | National Bank Direct Brokerage (NBDB) | | NBI Private Wealth Management | National Bank Investments | |
| Equitable Bank | | EQ Bank | | | | | |

== 2008 financial crisis ==
During the peak of the 2008 financial crisis, the Bank of Canada, along with the Canada Mortgage and Housing Corporation and the US Federal Reserve provided up to $114 billion of liquidity support to Canadian banks. Of this amount, $69 billion was part of the CMHC mortgage insurance program, a facility set up in 1954 to handle such situations.

The World Economic Forum, In the 2010-2011 report Canada ranked 1st in the "Soundness of banks" indicator ranking as the world's soundest banking system for six consecutive years (2007–2013) according to reports by the World Economic Forum. Released in October 2010, Global Finance magazine put Royal Bank of Canada at number 10 among the world's safest banks and Toronto-Dominion Bank at number 15.

== Dispute resolution ==
Since the late 1990s, dispute resolution across the sector was directed to the independent Ombudsman for Banking Services and Investments (OSBI). As of 2018, Royal Bank of Canada, Toronto-Dominion Bank and Scotiabank direct dispute resolution to the for-profit Chambers Banking Ombuds Office (ADRBO). As reported in The Globe and Mail in 2018, "[t]he Canadian Foundation for Advancement of Investor Rights (FAIR) has compared ADRBO unfavourably with OBSI," noting a statement from FAIR that they "have serious concerns about the conflicts of interest, misaligned incentives, and level of transparency and accountability at ADRBO". In 2018, John Lawford, executive director of consumer rights group the Public Interest Advocacy Centre, criticized ADRBO for not "[adhering] to the same openness principles" that OBSI brought to the table, adding that customer's are likely to experience "less success with their banking complaints" at ADRBO as a result. As of 2021, National Bank of Canada and Digital Commerce Bank are also reported to use ADRBO. In 2021, concerning an incident where TD Bank was able to find records that RSP funds has been transferred out of a customer's account, but not find records as to where they had gone, Duff Conacher, cofounder of accountability group Democracy Watch, observed that "most of Canada's big banks are avoiding accountability by essentially policing themselves when it comes to consumer complaints."

== See also ==
- Canada Deposit Insurance Corporation
- Canadian Bankers Association
- Credit unions in Canada
- FATCA agreement between Canada and the United States
- List of banks and credit unions in Canada
- Routing number (Canada)
