= Big Five banks of Canada =

Big Five is the name colloquially given to the five largest banks that dominate the banking industry of Canada: Bank of Montreal (BMO), Bank of Nova Scotia (Scotiabank), Canadian Imperial Bank of Commerce (CIBC), Royal Bank of Canada (RBC), and Toronto-Dominion Bank (TD).

All of the five Canadian banks maintain their respective headquarters in Toronto's Financial District, primarily along Bay Street. All five banks are classified as Schedule I banks that are domestic banks operating in Canada under government charter. The banks' shares are widely held, with any entity allowed to hold a maximum of twenty percent.

According to a ranking produced by Standard & Poor's, in 2017, the Big Five banks of Canada are among the world's 100 largest banks, with TD, RBC, Scotiabank, BMO, and CIBC at 26th, 28th, 45th, 52nd, and 63rd place, respectively. RBC and TD Bank are also on the Financial Stability Board's list of systemically important banks as of 2020.

The term “Big Six” is sometimes used to include Canada's next largest bank, National Bank of Canada.

== Overview ==
The Big Five banks, listed in order of market capitalization on the Toronto Stock Exchange as of year-ended 2023, with their current corporate brand names and corporate profiles according to their latest annual report, all monetary amounts are in billions of Canadian dollars, are:

| Official name | Bank brand(s) | Operational headquarters | Legal incorporation | Assets (C$ bn, 2025) | Revenue (C$ bn, 2025) | Capitalization (C$ bn) | Branches (Canada only) | Employees (Full-time equivalent) | Reference |
|---|---|---|---|---|---|---|---|---|---|
| Royal Bank of Canada | RBC Royal Bank | Royal Bank Plaza, Toronto (Note: Royal Bank of Canada lists Royal Bank Plaza as its corporate headquarters, and Place Ville Marie as its head office.) | Halifax (1864) | $2,325 | $66.61 | $155.12 | 1,247 | 91,398 | |
| Toronto-Dominion Bank | TD Canada Trust; MBNA Canada | Toronto-Dominion Centre, Toronto | Toronto (1955) | $2,095 | $67.78 | $138.70 | 1,062 | 103,257 | |
| Bank of Montreal | BMO Bank of Montreal | First Canadian Place, Toronto (Note: The official head office of the Bank of Montreal is located on Saint Jacques Street, Montreal, although First Canadian Place serves as the Bank of Montreal's operational headquarters.) | Montreal (1817) | $1,477 | $36.27 | $75.50 | 900 | 55,767 | |
| Bank of Nova Scotia | Scotiabank (full-service); Tangerine (direct) | Scotia Plaza, Toronto | Halifax (1832) | $1,460 | $37.74 | $68.17 | 947 | 89,483 | |
| Canadian Imperial Bank of Commerce | CIBC (full-service); Simplii Financial (direct) | CIBC Square, Toronto | Toronto (1961) | $1,117 | $29.13 | $45.54 | 1,001 | 48,074 | |

In modern history, Royal Bank (RBC) has always been the largest by a significant margin, although TD Bank has caught up to RBC in recent years. Up to the late 1990s, CIBC was the second largest, followed by Bank of Montreal, Scotiabank, and TD Bank. During the late 1990s and beyond, this ranking changed due to several reorganizations. Royal Bank acquired Royal Trust in 1993, while Scotiabank purchased National Trust in 1997. As Scotiabank found no merger partners among the other banks in the big five group, it instead expanded its international operations and passed the Bank of Montreal in size. TD Bank merged with Canada Trust, which was for a long time the largest trust in Canada, thus vaulting TD into the number two spot. While there were no major changes to Bank of Montreal, CIBC's first unsuccessful foray into the US market led it to shed its assets there, dropping it to the number five spot.

Four of the Big Five Canadian banks have acquired independent investment banks, whose activities included corporate banking and full service brokerage. From 2000 onwards, these investment banking subsidiaries, RBC Dominion Securities, BMO Nesbitt Burns, CIBC Wood Gundy, and McLeod Young Weir, were all rebranded to RBC Capital Markets, BMO Capital Markets, CIBC Capital Markets, and Scotia Capital, respectively. Nonetheless, their bank holding company parent still use the old names as a brand for their full service brokerage under wealth management, plus the old name still remains the broker dealer subsidiary for their investment bank in Canada.

== Other large Canadian banks ==
All monetary amounts are in billions C$, updated as of year-ended 2021.

| Official names | Operational head office | Assets (C$ bn) | Deposits (C$ bn) | Capitalization (C$ bn) | Branches (Canada only) | Employees (Full-time equivalent) | Reference |
|---|---|---|---|---|---|---|---|
| National Bank of Canada | National Bank Place, Montreal | $355.80 | $240.94 | $34.62 | 384 | 26,920 | |
| Equitable Bank | Equitable Bank Tower, Toronto | $36.16 | $20.70 | $2.348 | 0 | 1,161 | |

== Large non-bank financial institutions ==
All monetary amounts are in billions C$, updated as of year-ended 2021.

| Official names | Operational head office | Assets (C$ bn) | Branches (Canada only) | Employees (Full-time equivalent) | Reference |
|---|---|---|---|---|---|
| Desjardins Group | Lévis, Quebec, Canada | $422.90 | 204 | 56,165 | |
| Wealthsimple | Toronto, Canada | $150.00 | — | ~1,700 | |
| ATB Financial | ATB Place, Edmonton | $55.76 | 162 | 5,044 | |

Desjardins Group and ATB Financial are major regional financial institutions. Desjardins, a federation of 313 autonomous credit unions (French: caisses populaires), is one of the largest financial institutions in Quebec and also operates in some regions of Ontario with substantial Franco-Ontarian populations. ATB Financial (formerly Alberta Treasury Branches) is a Crown corporation owned by the Alberta provincial government that was originally established in 1938 after the province's attempt to impose social credit policies on federally-regulated banks failed.

== Proposed mergers ==
In 1998, the Bank of Montreal proposed a merger with the Royal Bank of Canada around the same time that CIBC proposed to combine with the Toronto-Dominion Bank. The banks argued that these mergers would enable them to compete globally with other financial institutions. This would have left Canada with only three major national banks. The mergers were reviewed by the Competition Bureau of Canada, which declared that negative effects (such as higher user fees and local branch closures) from the mergers would far outweigh the benefits of allowing the mergers. Ultimately, it was then Finance Minister Paul Martin who rejected both proposed mergers. The issue since has not been revisited by succeeding Finance Ministers; it has been cited as a reason that the Canadian economy easily weathered the 2007 subprime mortgage financial crisis compared to other nations, and the aforementioned recognition of numerous Canadian banks on the Bloomberg 2011 list of twenty strongest large banks in the world.

=== Potential foreign forays ===
The weakness of the Canadian dollar and high U.S. bank stock prices were commonly cited as obstacles to purchasing assets south of the border. However the 2007 subprime mortgage crisis reversed this trend. In the aftermath of the crisis, the Canadian dollar steadily climbed against the U.S. dollar, achieving parity in early 2008 and trading as high as 30 cents above the USD in late 2008. The strength of the Canadian dollar and the relative weakness of U.S. bank prices have led commentators to suggest that the big five banks could consider an expansion into the United States.

Because of the recent recession, Royal Bank of Canada has now eclipsed Morgan Stanley in terms of market valuation. According to figures compiled by a recent Bloomberg report, investors today are willing to pay about $2.60 for every dollar of book value at a Canadian bank, compared with $1.70 in the United States. That ratio is about the reverse of where it stood in late 1999.

The last time the U.S. financial markets were weak, many Canadian bank CEOs were criticized for not making a more concerted buying effort. Some believed that these CEOs preferred to wait for Ottawa to allow domestic mergers before expanding into the US. The federal government ended up refusing to allow the mergers and is unlikely to do so now. Analysts also pointed out that Canadian banks have much stronger balance sheets today than they did 10 or 15 years ago, putting them in an even better position to be aggressive.

In October 2007, TD purchased Commerce Bancorp, a medium-sized US bank with a strong branch network in the Mid-Atlantic states and Florida. As of March 2008, their stated plan was to merge Commerce with their existing TD Banknorth subsidiary, calling the new bank TD Commerce Bank. However, Commerce Bank based in Worcester, Massachusetts challenged the new name. As a result, TD renamed its US subsidiary TD Bank at end of 2009. TD is the sixth-largest bank by branch network in North America, after JPMorgan, Bank of America, Wells Fargo, PNC, and US Bank. It is also the largest foreign bank in the United States holding almost $200 billion (USD) in deposits.

=== Banking regulation ===
Canada's federal government has sole jurisdiction for banks according to the Canadian Constitution, specifically Section 91(15) of The Constitution Act 1867 (30 & 31 Victoria, c.3 (UK)), formerly known as the British North America Act 1867. Meanwhile, credit unions/caisses populaires, securities dealers and mutual funds are largely regulated by provincial governments.

The main federal statute for the incorporation and regulation of banks, or chartered banks, is the Bank Act (S.C. 1991, c.46), where Schedules I, II and III of this Act list all banks permitted to operate in Canada under these three distinct categories.

== Mergers and anti-competition ==
- EQ Bank merged with Concentra Bank and subsidiaries in 2022.
- RBC completed the acquisition of HSBC Canada, splitting some assets with National Bank for competition issues.
- National Bank purchased Canadian Western Bank in 2025

== See also ==
- Banking in Canada
- Big Four, a list of the largest banks in other countries across the world
- Credit union
- List of banks and credit unions in Canada
