= HomeEquity Bank =

Schedule 1 Canadian Chartered Bank

HomeEquity Bank (French: Banque HomeEquity) is a Schedule 1 Canadian Chartered Bank, founded in 1986 as the Canadian Home Income Plan Corporation. HomeEquity Bank is the first Canadian bank to offer reverse mortgages to Canadian homeowners aged 55 and over. HomeEquity Bank originated $767 million reverse mortgages in 2018, up 26% from the previous year. By the end of 2022, HomeEquity Bank had grown its mortgage portfolio to over $5 Billion (Cdn.), representing an annual growth rate of 23%.

In addition to the CHIP Reverse Mortgage, HomeEquity Bank also offers the Income Advantage loan, CHIPMax and GICs.

== History ==
=== Origin ===
The Canadian Home Income Plan Corporation was founded in 1986 in Vancouver by William Turner. In 2001, the Canadian Home Income Plan expanded by offering their services in Ontario and Alberta, followed by the rest of the Canadian provinces.

In 2009, the company (then known as HomEquity Bank) became chartered and on October 13, 2009, it was recognized as a schedule one bank in Canada.

=== Birch Hill Equity Partners acquisition ===
In 2012, Birch Hill Equity Partners acquired all outstanding shares of the company.

In 2013, HomEquity Bank launched a product named Income Advantage aimed at providing a steady stream of income during retirement. Later in 2014, HomeEquity Bank's original product, the Canadian Home Income Plan, was rebranded as the CHIP Reverse Mortgage.

HomEquity charged substantially higher interest rates on its reverse mortgage loans than other banks were charging for traditional fixed-term mortgages, reflecting the undetermined payback schedule, the risk of a home losing value during the life of the loan, and a lack of competition in the reverse mortgage field in Canada after sole competitor Seniors Money Canada stopped offering new loans.

=== Corporate rebrand ===
In 2018, HomeEquity Bank launched a corporate rebrand, changing its name from HomEquity bank to HomeEquity Bank, redesigning its logo and adopting the catchphrase 'There's No Retirement Like Home'. For a number of years, HomeEquity Bank had been the only company in Canada offering reverse mortgages; 2018's entry of Equitable Bank into the field was followed by the lowering of interest rates. HomeEquity registered about $800 million in reverse mortgages that year.

=== Ontario Teacher's Pension Plan Acquisition ===
On July 4, 2022, HomeEquity Bank was purchased by the Ontario Teacher's Pension Plan for an undisclosed amount from Birch Hill and the other minority shareholders, in a deal that was first announced in September 2021.
