= Bank of British Columbia =

Two Canadian banks (1862–1901; 1955-1986)

- Type: Private
- Industry: Banking, Financial services
- Founded: 1862 - 1901 (first bank) (merged with Canadian Bank of Commerce); 1966 - 1986 (second bank) (rescued and merged into Hongkong Bank of Canada)
- Headquarters: British Columbia, Canada

Two Canadian banks have been named the Bank of British Columbia. The first ran from 1862 to 1901 and merged with the Canadian Imperial Bank of Commerce. The second operated from 1966 to 1986 and was merged into the Hongkong Bank of Canada.

== The first bank: 1862–1901 ==
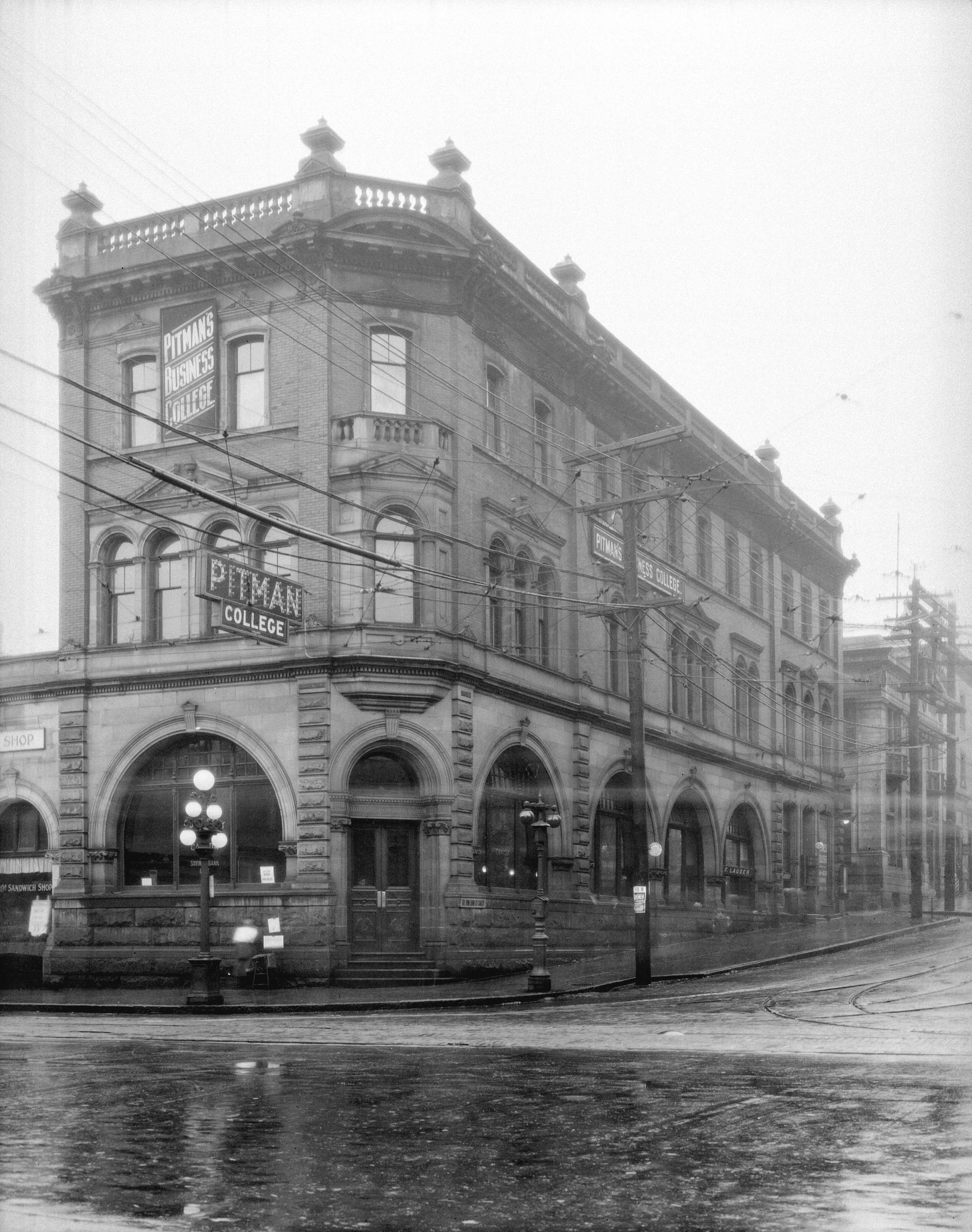
The 1890 head office at 490 West Hastings in Vancouver, designed by Thomas Charles Sorby

The first one was established by Royal Charter in 1862, with its head office in London. Between 1862 and 1871, it issued dollar banknotes. By 1885, branches operated in San Francisco, Portland (est. 1866), Victoria (est. 1862) and New Westminster (est. 1862). In 1889, a branch was established in Seattle. In 1901, it merged with the Canadian Bank of Commerce. At the time of the merger, branches existed in Vancouver (est. 1886), Victoria, Kamloops, Nanaimo, Nelson, New Westminster, Rossland, Sandon, San Francisco, Portland, and London.

=== Banknotes ===
There remains $48,797 in outstanding banknotes from the bank of British Columbia, in $1, $5, $10, $20 and $50 denominations. The bills were issued from 1863 to 1894 and in the 1970s they brought anywhere from $500 to $1,500 per bill on the collector's market.

=== Architecture ===
In British Columbia, the Victoria branch was built in 1885 and was designated as a heritage site by the City of Victoria in 1975. The Vancouver branch was built in 1889 to 1891 and was added to Vancouver's Community Heritage Register in 1986.

=== Further reading ===
- Ross, Victor (1920). "A history of the Canadian Bank of Commerce : with an account of the other banks which now form part of its organization". library.ubc.ca. pp. 341–476 (251–350).

== The second bank: 1966–1986 ==
The second bank was chartered in 1966 with headquarters in Vancouver and was the creation of W.A.C. Bennett, the Premier of British Columbia. Bennett, a businessman, wanted to end Central Canada's control over the banking industry, which obliged all but the smaller loans for companies in British Columbia to receive authorization from head offices in either Montreal or Toronto.

In 1986, the bank had 1,410 employees, 41 branches in BC and Alberta, and offices in the Cayman Islands, the US, and Hong Kong. Assets in 1986 were CAD$2.7 billion, which put the bank 27th among banks and financial institutions in Canada. Revenue in 1986 was $324 million.

Following financial difficulties arising from the decline of the western oil economy, the collapses of Canadian Commercial Bank and Northland Bank had a serious impact on other institutions that depended on wholesale deposit funding. Like the many Trust Companies and Credit Union amalgamations in 1986, the Canadian government permitted the Hongkong Bank of Canada (HSBC) to rescue it.

== See also ==
- List of Canadian banks
- Canada Deposit Insurance Corporation
- Canadian chartered bank notes
