= President's Choice Financial =

Subsidiary of the Loblaw Companies

- Type: Subsidiary
- Industry: Financial services
- Founded: 1996; 30 years ago
- Headquarters: Toronto, Ontario, Canada
- Number of employees: 1,097
- Parent: CIBC (joint-venture; 1996–2017); Loblaw Companies (2017–2026); EQB (2026–present)

President's Choice Financial (French: Services financiers le Choix du Président), commonly shortened to PC Financial, is the financial service brand of the Canadian supermarket chain Loblaw Companies.

Two different wholly owned subsidiaries of Loblaw Companies provide services under the President's Choice Financial brand: personal banking and Mastercard credit card services are provided by the federally chartered President's Choice Bank, and insurance is provided by PC Financial Insurance Brokers.

In December 2025, it was announced the Toronto-headquartered Equitable Bank (EQB) had entered into a definitive agreement to acquire PC Financial from Loblaw Companies. The acquisition was valued at $800 million and includes President's Choice Bank, PC Financial Insurance Agency Inc, PC Financial Insurance Brokers Inc, and other affiliated entities. The acquisition was completed on July 1, 2026.

== Services ==
=== Bank machines (ATMs) ===
Most Loblaws and Loblaws-owned stores offer access to a PC Financial-branded ATM. These ATMs can be used for no fee by PC Financial customers. All other customers who use the ATMs will be charged fees.

=== Mastercard credit cards ===
PC Financial MasterCards are embedded with PayPass technology. In November 2014, Ugo Wallet, a mobile wallet app for Android was launched in partnership with TD Canada Trust. In addition, users can store PC credit cards on Apple Pay and Android Pay.

=== Insurance ===
President's Choice offers auto insurance and home insurance, underwritten through a broker model by a number of Canadian insurance companies, pet insurance, underwritten by SecuriCan General Insurance Company, and travel insurance by Travel Guard Canada as managing general underwriter and agent for American Home Assurance Company. President's Choice discontinued their home and auto insurance offerings to new customers in 2009 for a brief period as structural changes were made. During this time, the previous partnership with Aviva came to an end. Their home and auto insurance products returned under a separate "broker model" in January 2010.

=== Consumer banking (since 2020) ===
President's Choice Financial launched the PC Money Account, a no-fee "debit-like" personal banking service, on September 14, 2020. Unlike its former banking service, which was provided by CIBC, PC Money Accounts are issued directly by President's Choice Bank. The PC Money Account card can be used to collect PC Optimum points on purchases, and can be used online and worldwide at any retailer that accepts Mastercard. Unlike conventional chequing accounts in Canada, the PC Money Account does not use the Interac network on domestic debit purchase transactions, as the card operates on MasterCard’s global payment network; it is a prepaid card.

== Former services ==
=== Consumer banking (1996–2017) ===
Standard consumer banking products (chequing accounts, savings accounts, loans, mortgages) were provided as a joint venture with the Canadian Imperial Bank of Commerce; this partnership began in 1996. CIBC offered lines of credit, loans, Registered Retirement Savings Plan (RRSPs), and mortgages using the President's Choice brand under licence, except for between January 2001 and October 2005 when banking services were provided by Amicus Bank (a CIBC subsidiary). Services were available in all Canadian provinces, except Quebec. All PC Financial bank accounts had the same bank number as CIBC (010), and were located under one transit/branch number (30800).

Clients performed their banking transactions on the Internet, at a PC- or CIBC-branded ATM, by telephone, or in person at pavilions located inside Loblaw-affiliated stores.

President's Choice Financial consumer banking services were ranked by J.D. Power and Associates as having the highest customer satisfaction among mid-size Canadian banks in 2007, 2008, 2009, 2010, and 2011.

On August 16, 2017, it was announced that Loblaw Companies and CIBC had mutually decided to terminate their joint venture to provide consumer banking products. All PC Financial mortgages, loans, investments, and bank accounts were transferred to CIBC's new direct banking brand Simplii Financial effective November 1, 2017. PC Financial's credit card and insurance products were unaffected by the decision, and continued to be offered by subsidiaries of Loblaw Companies. At the time of the announcement the consumer banking products had approximately 2 million customers.

== Loyalty program ==
Customers collect PC Optimum reward points on purchases made with their President's Choice Financial Mastercard credit cards, as well as with purchases made with the PC Money Account.

== See also ==
- List of banks in Canada
- President's Choice
- Simplii Financial

== Footnotes ==
1. BMO closes supermarket locations
2. 2010 Canadian Retail Banking Customer Satisfaction Study
3. PC Financial Online Application
4. President's Choice Financial FAQs
5. PC MasterCard
