= Wealth One Bank of Canada =

Canadian bank

- Type: Private Schedule I bank
- Industry: Finance
- Founded: 2016; 10 years ago
- Headquarters: 18 King Street East, Toronto, Ontario, Canada
- Key people: John Webster (CEO)
- Services: Banking, lending
- Website: www.wealthonebankofcanada.com

Wealth One Bank of Canada Wealth One Bank of Canada (stylized as WealthONE) is a Canadian federally chartered Schedule I digital bank headquartered in Toronto, Ontario. Founded in 2016, the bank initially focused on serving Chinese Canadian customers and has since expanded its banking, lending, and deposit services to a broader customer base across Canada. In 2025, the bank was acquired by a consortium of Canadian investors led by Globalive Capital Inc., which is owned by Anthony Lacavera.

== History ==
Wealth One Bank of Canada was founded by a group of investors led by Shenglin Xian, who sought to establish a federally regulated Canadian bank focused on serving the Chinese Canadian community. The company began pursuing a federal banking charter in the early 2010s and received its charter in 2016.

On July 22, 2015, WealthONE received its tentative Letters patent from Canada's Minister of Finance. The bank was officially chartered federally in 2016 as a Schedule I bank under the Bank Act. As such, it is regulated by the Office of the Superintendent of Financial Institutions (OSFI) and is a member of the Canada Deposit Insurance Corporation, a federal Crown corporation that insures eligible deposits at member institutions, subject to coverage limits.

In November 2016, The Globe and Mail published an article claiming that the bank's website included inaccurate profiles of its key investors and that its founder previously faced allegations of mishandling client insurance claims. WealthONE responded in a letter stating that "like every other Schedule 1 bank in Canada, Wealth One Bank had to go through an exacting and rigorous process under the Bank Act and OSFI... We're very proud of the fact that [WealthONE] met those stringent standards."

The bank's head office is located in Toronto's Financial District. The bank began offering mortgages, loans and deposit products in 2016. It hopes to attract new customers who "may have a solid net worth, just not the kind of proof of income or credit ratings that [other] lenders may prefer." The bank's customer-facing staff are able to interact with customers in English, Cantonese and Mandarin.

In October 2020, Paul Leonard was appointed as the new Chief Executive Officer and President of the bank. Leonard first joined WealthONE as CFO in 2018. As CEO, he reported that the bank had about 700 borrowers, 7,000 deposit accounts and $375 million in total assets as of November 2020.

In February 2023, The Globe and Mail reported that the bank's three principal shareholders had been under investigation by the Canadian Security Intelligence Service (CSIS) since 2021 and, later, by the Department of Finance Canada. In September 2024, then-Finance Minister Chrystia Freeland filed documents in federal court stating that the three shareholders were considered vulnerable to coercion by the Chinese Communist Party and raising concerns about potential money laundering and foreign interference.

In June 2025, the Government of Canada approved the acquisition of Wealth One Bank of Canada by a consortium of Canadian investors led by Globalive Capital Inc. The transaction resulted in the divestiture of the bank's previous principal shareholders and the transfer of ownership to a consortium of Canadian investors led by Globalive Capital Inc. The consortium was led by Anthony Lacavera, founder of Globalive and Freedom Mobile. At the time of the transaction, Wealth One reported assets of more than $516 million, primarily consisting of residential mortgage loans.

In August 2025, Wealth One Bank of Canada announced the departure of President and Chief Executive Officer Paul Leonard following the completion of the bank's acquisition by a consortium led by Globalive Capital Inc. John Webster, who had joined the bank as Chair of the Board in July 2025, was appointed interim President and Chief Executive Officer. On March 12, 2026, Webster was appointed permanent President and Chief Executive Officer. Prior to joining WealthONE, he held senior leadership positions with Bank of Nova Scotia, Scotia Mortgage Authority, and Maple Trust Company.

In December 2025, WealthONE announced that former Community Trust executive Grant Armstrong would join the bank as Vice President and Chief Credit Officer in January 2026

== Products and services ==
WealthONE offers personal deposit, investment, and lending products. Its deposit and investment products include high-interest savings accounts (HISAs), Guaranteed Investment Certificates (GICs), and registered savings products, including Registered Retirement Savings Plans (RRSPs).

The bank also offers residential, investment-property and commercial mortgages, with lending programs aimed at borrowers including self-employed individuals, newcomers to Canada, real estate investors and high-net-worth individuals. WealthONE also provides cash surrender value (CSV) lending, which allows qualifying borrowers to access credit using the cash value of eligible life insurance policies.

In 2026, WealthONE launched a Refer-a-Friend program for existing customers. Under the program, both the referring customer and eligible new customer receive a referral reward after the new customer opens and funds a qualifying account and meets the program requirements. The program launched with a $25 reward for each participant and no stated limit on the number of eligible referrals an existing customer could make.
