= Coast Capital Savings =

Canadian financial co-operative

Coast Capital Savings Federal Credit Union

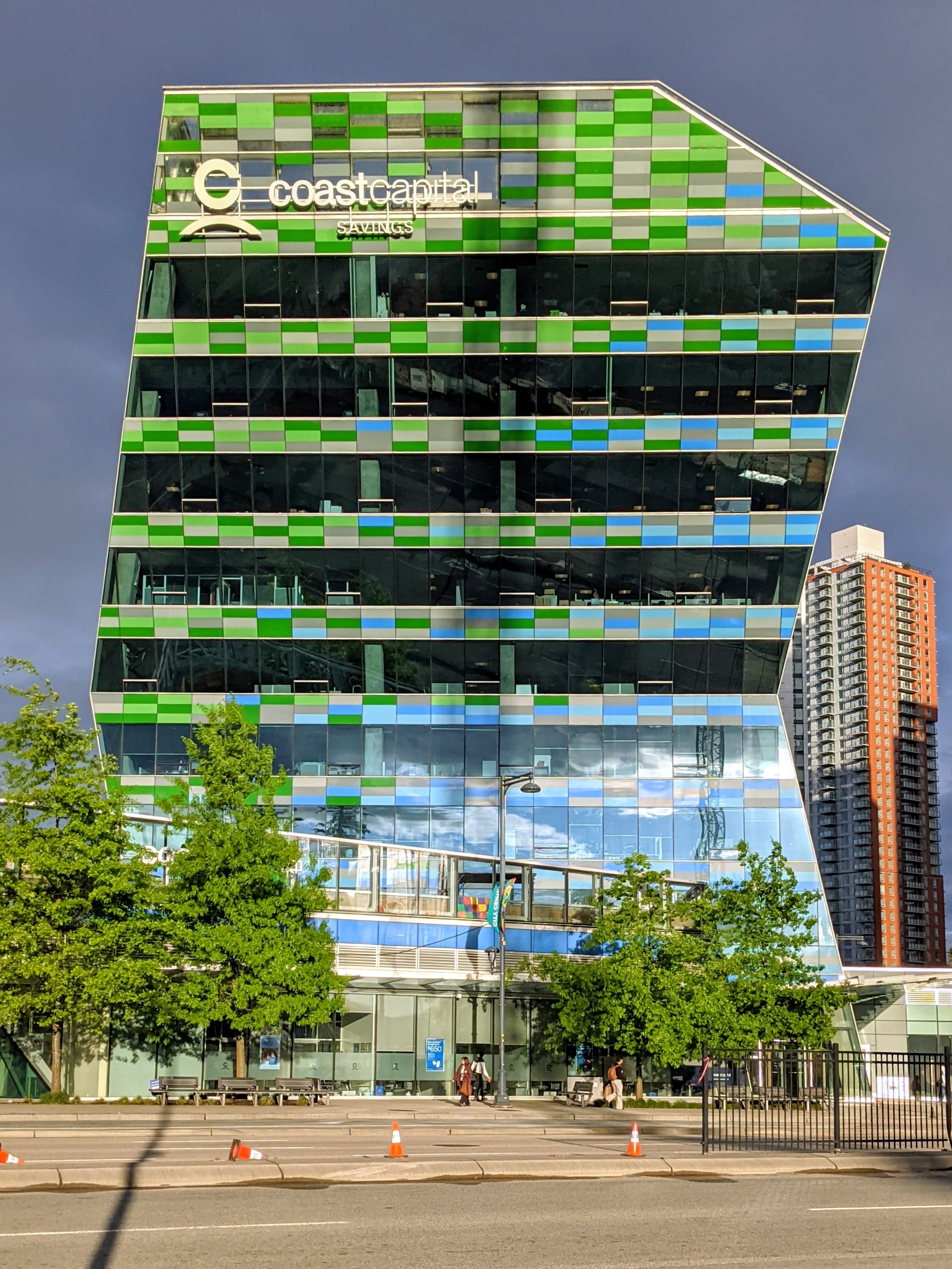
- Head office located at King George Hub
- Type: Federal credit union
- Industry: Financial services
- Founded: 1940; 86 years ago
- Headquarters: 9900 King George Boulevard; Surrey, British Columbia, Canada
- Key people: Calvin MacInnis, President, Director and CEO
- Net income: $14.6 million CAD (2024)
- Total assets: $21.9 billion CAD (2024)
- Website: coastcapitalsavings.com

Coast Capital Savings (formally Coast Capital Savings Federal Credit Union) is a member-owned financial co-operative based in Surrey, British Columbia with 1,800 employees across Canada. It has more 600,000 members through its 45-location branch network. In 2024, Coast Capital's net income was at $14.6 million and has branches located in British Columbia, including Metro Vancouver, Fraser Valley, Okanagan and Vancouver Island regions.

== History ==
Concerned about the uncertain financial future following the Great Depression, when money was hard to come by, groups of individuals on B.C.'s Vancouver Island, neighbouring Gulf Islands, and the Greater Vancouver cities of Richmond and Surrey formed small financial co-ops focused on helping their neighbours and colleagues obtain the financial assistance they required to better their lives.

Coast Capital Savings Credit Union was created out of a merger on December 31, 2000, between Pacific Coast Savings Credit Union and Richmond Savings Credit Union. At the time, the merged entity's $3.2 billion in assets made it the second largest credit union in Canada behind Vancity's $6.4 billion. In June 2002, Coast Capital Savings acquired Surrey Metro Savings, expanding the reach of the credit union from Vancouver Island to the Fraser Valley.

In the years that followed the merger with Surrey Metro Savings, Coast Capital Savings membership grew from 300,000 members in 2002 to more than 600,000 members in 2024. The asset base of the credit union increased from $6.1 billion to over $21.9 billion between 2002 and 2024.

From October 17 to November 28, 2016, a vote was held for members on whether Coast Capital Savings should become a federal credit union. 79.2% of the 79,726 voting members voted in favour, with the announcement coming from a Special General Meeting held on December 14, 2016. Coast Capital Savings is the second federal credit union, after New Brunswick's Fédération des caisses populaires acadiennes (UNI) in July 2016. Pursuant to a federal letters patent, Coast Capital was renamed Coast Capital Savings Federal Credit Union (and in French Coopérative de crédit fédérale Coast Capital Savings) effective November 1, 2018.

In June 2018, Coast Capital became a Certified B Corporation and successfully recertified in late 2021. Coast Capital earned an overall score of 112.8 in 2021, an 11.9 point increase over its 2018 result. In March 2022, Coast Capital ranked in the platinum category of the 2022 Corporate Knight's Social Purpose Ranking.

On April 3, 2025, Coast Capital Savings, Prospera Credit Union, and Sunshine Coast announced their intent to merge. After the voting period, the merger was officially approved on July 9, 2025 with 90% of Coast Capital members approving the merger. The merger was finalized and legally closed on May 6, 2026.
