= Home Capital Group =

Canadian holding company

Home Capital Group Inc.
- Type: Public
- Traded as: TSX: HCG
- Industry: Credit Mortgage lending
- Founded: 1977
- Headquarters: Toronto, Ontario, Canada
- Key people: Yousry Bissada CEO; Brad Kotush CFO
- Products: Credit cards Securities; Retirement Savings Plan
- Number of employees: 704 (Average during 2018)
- Divisions: Home Trust Company
- Website: www.homecapital.com/index.asp

Home Capital Group is a Canadian holding company. Through its subsidiary Home Trust Company, it provides Canadians a range of credit products including mortgages, credit cards and deposit services. It is regulated under federal legislation. Home Trust operates mainly in regions considered low risk where above average returns may be achieved; it also tends to focus on areas largely ignored by other mortgage lenders. During the 2008 economic crisis, it faced less competition (the number of competitors was halved over the last couple years) and its customer base is unique (overrepresented by people who have had credit problems). Mortgaged properties are residential and non-residential and include apartment and office buildings, hotels, construction and industrial complexes (retail mortgage lending which is also one of the main sources of organic growth, is at the core of the company's business). In 2009, its stock outperformed that of eight major competitors in the uninsured mortgage market.

In 2010, it improved the technology used in data/information transfers, which increased the speed and overall efficiency of transactions. When the government of Canada added restrictions to mortgage lending, concerns were raised about new disruptions to Canada's housing market. Home Capital considered it beneficial to the market's overall stability.

== History ==
Home Capital Group was established in 1977 as Sonor Resources Corp. It became Home Capital Group Inc. in 1986. During the 2009 fiscal year its workforce grew 24.3% (from 395 to 491).

- On November 25, 2013, Home Trust launched Oaken Financial to provide financial services directly to consumers through the Internet.
- On November 10, 2014, Home Trust announced that it intends to apply to the Minister of Finance to charter a Schedule I bank subsidiary to be called Home Trust Bank in English ("Banque Home Trust" in French).
- On June 22, 2017, it was announced that companies run by Warren Buffett will be making a $400 million equity investment in Home Capital Group. In addition, a subsidiary of Buffett's Berkshire Hathaway will extend a $2 billion line of credit to the company. Shares of Home Capital Group closed the day with a 27% gain subsequent to the news of Buffett's investment.

== Fraud ==
In July 2015, Home Capital Group suspended 45 brokers for creating mortgages with fraudulent income information;, the estimated value of mortgages from the suspended brokers on Home Capital's books is $1.5-2 billion. In March 2017, President and CEO Martin Reid was fired by the company. This came two weeks after several current and former officers and directors have received enforcement notices from the Ontario Securities Commission related to the company's past disclosure practices and, in some cases, trades in its shares.

== Business ==
Products include short term deposits, investment certificates, retirement savings plans/income funds, Tax-Free Savings Accounts, and government-insured mortgage securities. Consumer lending provides businesses and individuals services for credit cards (including those paid in full) and other loans. Because it targets the uninsured and those with financing problems (rejected by the large retail banks), people without much credit or past credit problems make up a large part of the client base.

Home Capital operates only in Canada where it holds the largest market share in the uninsured mortgage market. Although traditionally serving the uninsured mortgage market, insured mortgages represent the fastest growing business segment. Assets under administration represent 36.9% of total assets when combined with assets under administration. Residential mortgages make up 49.4% of all loans ($4.7 billion in September 2010).

== OSC Accusations ==
On April 19, 2017, the Ontario Securities Commission accused Home Capital of making "materially misleading statements" to investors. None of the allegations have been proven.

== Divisions and subsidiaries ==
For the first nine months of 2010 new insured mortgages amounted to $2.08 billion (twice that of the corresponding 2009 period) while those uninsured grew from $728.6 mill to $2.17 billion. It was started in 1988 and is 100% owned by Home Capital Group.

- Accelerator program - underwrites insured mortgages which it sells through the Canada Mortgage Bond program and mortgage-backed securities.
- Oaken Financial - Online financial services for individuals.
