= Standard Chartered Bank of Canada =

Bank of Canada

- Company type: Bank
- Founded: 1969
- Defunct: 1990s
- Fate: Branches merged into modern-day Bank of Montreal and Toronto-Dominion Bank, but retain advisory operations in Canada
- Headquarters: Toronto, Ontario, Canada

The Standard Chartered Bank of Canada was the Canadian banking unit of Standard Chartered. Standard Chartered bank was created by a merger of Standard Bank of British South Africa (1862) and the Chartered Bank of India, Australia and China (1853) in 1969. It quit Canada in the 1990s, selling its two retail branches to Bank of Montreal and its commercial branch to Toronto-Dominion Bank. Standard Chartered's separate metals services business Mocatta Metals was sold to Scotiabank in 1997 to form ScotiaMocatta.

Standard Chartered Bank operated two small offices in Calgary and Toronto through its acquisitions of Harrison Lovegrove & Co. and American Express Bank.

- Toronto - Gryphon Partners Canada Incorporated (20 Adelaide Street East) - ceased operations
- Calgary - Standard Chartered Corporate Finance (Canada) Limited (420, 635 8th Avenue SW, Hanover Place) - dissolved in 2018

== See also ==
- List of Canadian banks
