= Citibank Canada =

Canadian subsidiary of an American bank

- Trade name: Citi Canada
- Type: Subsidiary
- Industry: financial services
- Founded: 1919, Toronto, Ontario
- Headquarters: Citigroup Place 123 Front Street West, Suite 1900 Toronto, Ontario M5J 2M3
- Key people: CEO: John Hastings (Jul 6, 2010–)
- Number of employees: (Full-time equivalent, 2020) 1,700
- Website: citigroup.com/canada/en

Citibank Canada, operating as Citi Canada, is the Canadian subsidiary of the American multinational financial services corporation Citigroup. Citi Canada is headquartered in Toronto, Ontario, with offices in Calgary, London, Ontario, Montreal, Mississauga, and Vancouver.

== History ==
Citi Canada's Schedule 2 (foreign-owned, deposit-taking), under the Bank Act of Canada, subsidiary Citibank Canada is a member of the Canadian Bankers Association (CBA) and a member of the CDIC, a federal Crown corporation that insures deposits to applicable limits and across deposit categories.

Up until the finalization of the sale of its consumer finance subsidiary, CitiFinancial Canada, to affiliates of private equity firms J.C. Flowers & Co. and Värde Partners on April 3, 2017, the company engaged in consumer retail loans principally to sub-prime and near-prime borrowers. Both in the years preceding and after the sale transaction, CitiFinancial Canada, which was renamed Fairstone Financial, Inc. post-close, had 200 branches in Canada. Fairstone Financial later became a subsidiary of Duo Bank, which was then renamed Fairstone Bank.

== Products and services ==
The company provides securities trading, cash management, treasury, trade financing, custodial services, clearing, securities financing, depositary receipt, trust services, corporate banking, investment banking, private banking, and the private-label credit card of The Home Depot Canada. It had previously issued various MasterCard credit cards until Citi Canada sold that division (named Citi Cards Canada, Inc.) to CIBC in a $2.1 billion CAD deal in 2010.

== See also ==
- List of banks and credit unions in Canada
