= Fairstone Bank =

Fairstone Bank of Canada
- Trade name: Fairstone Bank
- Formerly: Wal-Mart Canada Bank (2009–2010); Walmart Canada Bank (2010–2018); Duo Bank of Canada (2018–2020)
- Type: Private
- Industry: Financial services
- Founded: 24 July 2009; 17 years ago (as Wal-Mart Canada Bank)
- Products: Banking; Credit cards; Mortgage loans; Subprime lending
- Owners: Smith Financial (75%); Centerbridge Partners; Ontario Teachers' Pension Plan
- Subsidiaries: Fairstone Financial; Fig Financial; Home Bank (Oaken Financial); Home Trust; Laurentian Bank of Canada
- Website: fairstonebank.ca

Fairstone Bank of Canada, usually shortened to Fairstone Bank, is a privately held Schedule 1 bank in Canada, and the parent entity of a group of companies which includes, among other units, subprime lender Fairstone Financial (or simply Fairstone), and Laurentian Bank of Canada.

Fairstone Bank is majority owned by Stephen J. R. Smith through Smith Financial Corporation, with Centerbridge Partners and the Ontario Teachers' Pension Plan (OTPP) as minority shareholders.

== History ==
Fairstone Bank was formed on July 24, 2009, as Wal-Mart Canada Bank, a Schedule 2 bank and subsidiary of Wal-Mart Canada. The bank was permitted to begin operations effective June 1, 2010, under the slightly amended name Walmart Canada Bank; it initially offered Walmart-branded Mastercard credit cards. It was acquired by Smith and Centerbridge in 2018, following which it was reclassified as a Schedule 1 bank and renamed Duo Bank of Canada.

With additional investment from the OTPP, Duo Bank acquired subprime lender Fairstone Financial in 2020, following which it adopted its current name. Fairstone Financial traces its history back to the 1926 founding of Community Finance, which later became part of Beneficial and later The Associates prior to its acquisition by Citigroup in 2000, which renamed the operation CitiFinancial. Citigroup had sold the unit to a group of investors, led by J.C. Flowers & Co. and Värde Partners, in 2017; the Fairstone name was adopted shortly thereafter.

In 2024, Fairstone was merged with alternative mortgage lender Home Trust, which Smith Financial had separately acquired as part of its purchase of Home Capital Group in late 2022.

In late 2025, Fairstone Bank announced an agreement to acquire Laurentian Bank of Canada, including its commercial banking business; Laurentian's retail banking operations would be simultaneously sold to National Bank of Canada. The transaction was completed in November 2026.
