= Questrade =

Canadian financial services company

Questrade Financial Group
- Type: Private
- Industry: Financial Services
- Founded: October 1, 1999; 26 years ago
- Headquarters: Toronto, Ontario, Canada
- Key people: Edward Kholodenko (CEO)
- Services: Stockbroker; Electronic trading platform Robo-advisor
- Number of employees: 2500 (2022)
- Website: www.questrade.com

Questrade is a Canadian online brokerage firm and wealth management firm.

== Products and services ==
The company was created by Edward Kholodenko and launched in 1999. As of early 2020, the company was Canada's fastest growing online brokerage firm, and has $30 billion under management, as of December 2024. Questrade has expanded to include robo-advising with its Questwealth Portfolios, which invests in portfolios based on ETFs. In December 2019, Questrade applied for a banking licence signalling its intent to offer banking services as QuestBank.

== See also ==
- List of electronic trading platforms
