= Prospera Credit Union =

Canadian credit union

Prospera
- Formerly: Prospera Credit Union
- Type: Credit union
- Industry: Financial services
- Predecessors: Edelweiss Credit Union; Fraser Valley Credit Union
- Founded: 2002
- Headquarters: Surrey, British Columbia, Canada (Note: The credit union was previously based in Abbotsford, British Columbia.)
- Number of locations: 24 (2024)
- Area served: Lower Mainland, Fraser Valley, and Okanagan, British Columbia, Canada
- Key people: Gavin Toy (president and CEO); Gina Arsens (chair)
- Total assets: C$7.53 billion (2023)
- Members: 115,634 (2023)
- Website: prospera.ca

Prospera Credit Union is a Canadian credit union in British Columbia. It was formed in 2002 as a merger of Edelweiss Credit Union, an originally German-Canadian credit union founded in 1943, and Fraser Valley Credit Union, founded in 1949. It merged with Westminster Savings Credit Union in 2020. As of 2023, the credit union had 115,634 members and C$7.53 billion in assets. Prospera is one of the largest credit unions in British Columbia and is headquartered in Surrey, British Columbia. Before its 2026 merger with Coast Capital Savings, it had 24 branches across the Lower Mainland, the Fraser Valley, and the Okanagan.

As of May 6, 2026, Prospera Credit Union merged with Coast Capital and Sunshine Coast Credit Union to become Coast Capital Savings Federal Credit Union.

== History ==
The original Prospera Credit Union traces its roots back to 1943, when it was originally founded as Edelweiss Credit Union. Over the years, it underwent several mergers and expansions, ultimately being renamed to Prospera in 2002, after a merger with Fraser Valley Credit Union.

On July 9, 2025, Prospera members voted 75% in favour of merging with Coast Capital Savings and Sunshine Coast Credit Union. The merger was finalized and legally closed on May 6, 2026.
