= Canadian Commercial Bank =

Failed bank based in Alberta, Canada

- Formerly: Canadian Commercial and Industrial Bank (until 1981)
- Type: Private
- Industry: Bank
- Founded: July 6, 1976
- Founder: G. Howard Eaton
- Defunct: September 3, 1985
- Fate: Bank failure
- Headquarters: Edmonton, Alberta, Canada
- Area served: Western Canada

Canadian Commercial Bank (CCB) was a bank based in Edmonton, Alberta, Canada, which failed in 1985. It received its parliamentary charter in 1975 and established its head office in Edmonton. The bank was privately owned and operated as a wholesale commercial bank.

== History ==
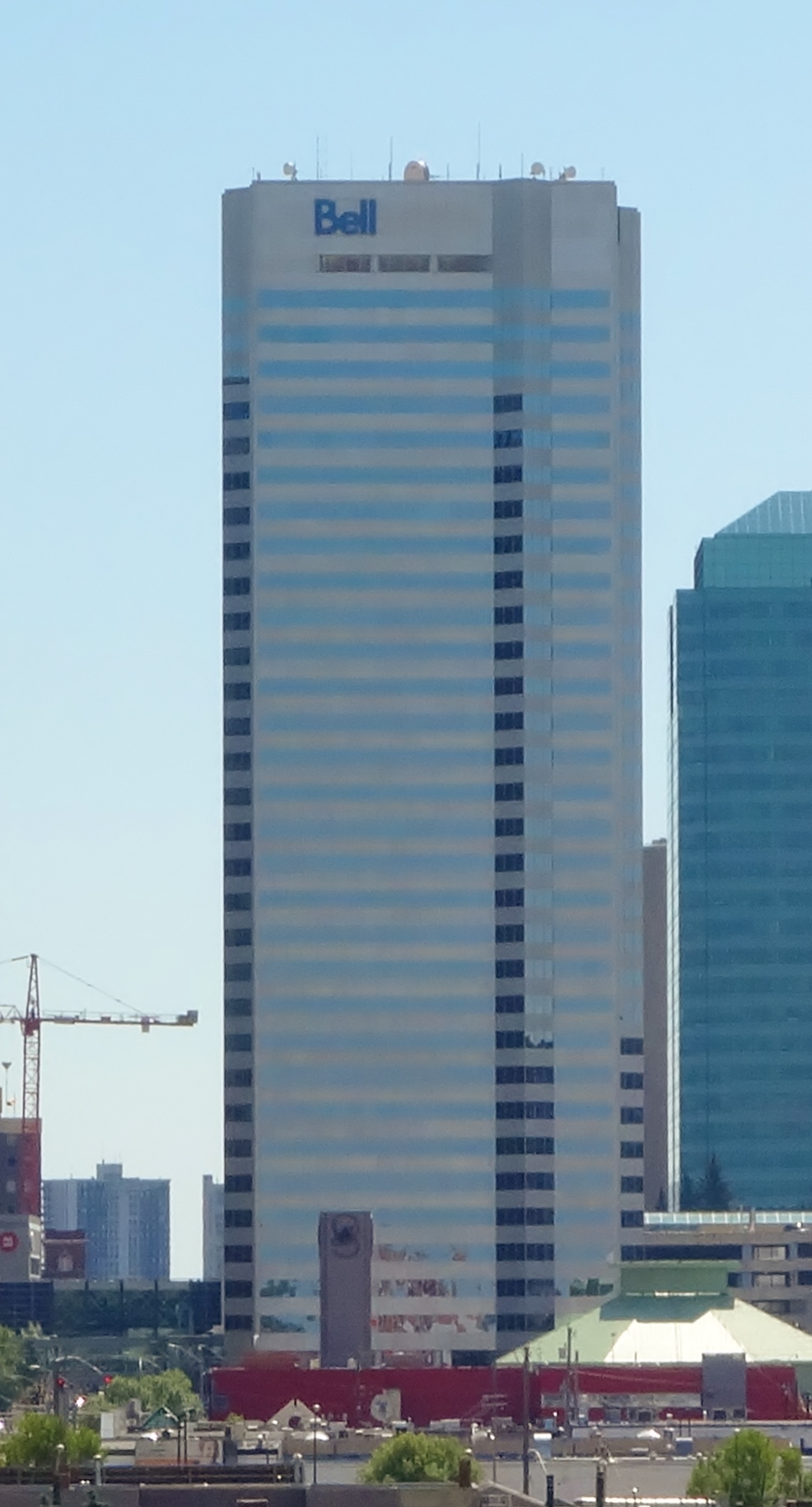
The CCB headquarters, now known as Bell Tower in Edmonton

The Canadian Commercial Bank officially began operations in July 1976, with CDN$22 million of capital. From 1976 to 1982, it operated profitably—usually in the top quartile of Canadian banking. It built a new headquarters in Edmonton, the Canadian Commercial Bank Tower in 1982.

In early 1985, after investing heavily in real estate and energy sector companies, the bank became insolvent during a period of rising interest rates and a falling Canadian dollar. The federal government arranged a $255 million bailout ($0.66 billion today) in an effort to keep the failing institution afloat. In spite of this, the bank ceased operations on September 3, 1985. It was the largest bank failure in Canadian history and the first in Canada in 60 years, though followed shortly that year by the failure of the Northland Bank.

Following the failures, the government weathered calls for the resignation of the governor of the Central Bank, Gerald Bouey. The failures of both banks were the subject of a Commission of Inquiry headed by Supreme Court of Canada Justice Willard Estey, who issued his report in 1986.

== See also ==
- List of banks in Canada
- Canada Deposit Insurance Corporation
