= Simplii Financial =

Canadian direct bank

- Type: Division
- Industry: Financial services
- Founded: November 1, 2017; 8 years ago
- Headquarters: Toronto, Ontario, Canada
- Parent: Canadian Imperial Bank of Commerce
- Website: simplii.com

Simplii Financial is a Canadian direct bank and the digital banking division of the Canadian Imperial Bank of Commerce (CIBC). It offers no-fee chequing and savings accounts, a VISA credit card, Guaranteed Investment Certificates (GICs), mortgages and mutual funds. These savings and investment products are also eligible for registration under a Tax-Free Savings Account (TFSA) or a Registered Retirement Savings Plan (RRSP).

As of 2023, the bank has almost two million clients.

== Background ==
Simplii Financial was established following CIBC and the supermarket chain Loblaw Companies mutually deciding to end their 20-year joint venture of providing consumer banking services under the President's Choice Financial brand.

As a completely online banking service, Simplii Financial has no branch locations. Simplii customers can withdraw and deposit cash and cheques at all CIBC ATMs for no fee.

Simplii Financial shares Institution Number 010 with its parent CIBC. Its SWIFT/BIC code is CIBCCATT, and all Simplii clients share a branch-transit number of 30800.

As a division of CIBC, Simplii Financial is insured under the Canada Deposit Insurance Corporation (CDIC).

== History ==
Disputes with Simplii traces its history back to the 1996 President's Choice Financial co-venture between CIBC and Loblaws to provide low-fee banking services. President's Choice Financial operated out of pavilions in various Loblaw-owned supermarkets but had no formal branches; instead, CIBC and PCF customers could use either brands' bank machines for no charge. In August 2017 the two co-venture partners decided to end the relationship.

Effective November 1, 2017 all two million President's Choice Financial bank accounts – as well as loans, mortgages, and investments – were transferred to Simplii, with Loblaws retaining their credit card portfolio issued by the separately chartered President's Choice Bank. Because CIBC was already the account provider for PCF bank accounts and other consumer products (excluding credit card and insurance services), all account numbers and terms remained the same. The first day of operations for the Simplii brand saw glitches in the mobile banking app, long call centre wait times, and customers reporting confusion about when to expect their new debit cards. The division switched customers to new cards in March 2018, with some complaints about temporarily frozen accounts.

In May 2018, Simplii and the Bank of Montreal were targets of hackers who claimed to have compromised the systems of both banks and stolen information on an originally-reported 90,000 combined customers. It was later confirmed that BMO had over 110,000 clients impacted by the data breach, while about 10,000 Simplii customers were affected by the hack. An email sent from a Russian address and attributed to the hackers demanded a US$1 million ransom paid via Ripple by end of day on May 28, 2018 or the stolen information would be released. Two men from Montreal were later arrested in September 2020 by RCMP for the cyberattacks and charged with unauthorized use of a computer, identity theft and possession of a device to obtain unauthorized use of computers.

About 1,200 Simplii customers had their accounts withdrawn in the attack, with the financial institution immediately returning all funds to its clients. Simplii offered its affected customers credit monitoring and identity theft insurance for free at the time of the breach, while also gifting $100 prepaid VISA cards in goodwill.

In June 2018, it was reported that there were proposed class-action lawsuits filed against Simplii Financial and BMO for the data breaches, which were settled in April 2021. The parties agreed to settle the action against BMO for $21.2 million, and against Simplii’s parent-company CIBC for $1.8 million.

Simplii Financial was listed in Forbes magazine's World's Best Banks 2019 list, which also ranked it the third best bank in Canada.

In 2021, Simplii Financial became the first in Canadian banking to enable digital identity verification – giving international students and newcomers the opportunity to open accounts completely digitally before arriving in Canada.

In June 2023, Simplii rebranded its look including logo and colours – replacing original navy blue and red tones with magenta pink, lime green and black. On its website, Simplii stated the changes set it “apart from the more old-fashioned competition.” A new slogan of "Start your Engines" was also announced.

== Products and services ==
In 2023, Simplii became the first Canadian bank to offer personal deposit accounts in Indian Rupee (INR) and Philippine Peso (PHP) when it introduced five new Foreign Currency Savings Accounts. Simplii also launched savings accounts in Chinese Yuan (CNH), British Pound Sterling (GBP) and Euro (EUR), while already offering an American Dollar (USD) Savings Account. Other products and services currently offered by Simplii include:

- Banking accounts – No fee chequing, high interest savings and USD savings accounts along with e-Transfers, mobile and online banking options
- Mortgages – variable and fixed residential
- Line of credit – personal loans, secured lines of credit and creditor insurance
- Credit card – Simplii Financial Cash Back Visa Card
- Investment products including GICs, RRSPs, TFSAs and mutual funds
- Simplii Financial Visa Digital Gift Card
- Global money transfers
- International Student Banking Offer including a Student Deposit Program and Student GIC Program
- New to Canada Banking Program

== Awards ==
Simplii had multiple products highlighted amongst the top in Canada in 2023.

Ratehub awarded Simplii’s No Fee Chequing Account the distinction of “Best Chequing Account” for 2023 as part of its annual Personal Finance Awards.

Meanwhile, American personal finance website NerdWallet named Simplii’s Cashback Visa credit card the “Best no-fee card overall,” and Fintech company Hardbacon recognized Simplii’s credit card as the “Best credit card for young adults in Canada.”

Since being founded in 2017, Simplii Financial has captured the most digital-banking awards, and was one of the major winners across all Canadian financial institutions and banking brands in the 2022 Ipsos Financial Service Excellence Awards with three wins.

The Ipsos Financial Service Excellence Awards included a win for Mobile Banking Excellence, fulfilling digital banking needs that became more pronounced in recent years.

The full list of winning categories for Simplii Financial in 2022 were:

- Value for Money
- Recommend to Family and Friends
- Mobile Banking Excellence

Simplii Financial has also been voted by clients as one of Forbes’ World’s Best Banks in Canada four years in a row (2019, 2020, 2021, 2022).

== See also ==
- List of banks in Canada
- Alterna Savings
- Motive Financial
- Tangerine
