= Equitable Bank =

Canadian bank

- Formerly: The Equitable Trust Company
- Type: Public
- Traded as: TSX: EQB
- Industry: Banking
- Founded: 1970
- Headquarters: Toronto, Canada
- Area served: Canada
- Key people: Andrew Moor (Late CEO)
- Revenue: ▼CA$1.26 billion (2025)
- Net income: ▼CA$354 million (2025)
- AUM: ▲CA$87.33 billion (2025)
- Total assets: ▲CA$53.49 billion (2025)
- Total equity: ▲CA$3.21 billion (2025)
- Number of employees: 1,947 (2025)
- Parent: EQB Inc.
- Website: www.equitablebank.ca

Equitable Bank is a Canadian bank that specializes in residential and commercial real estate lending, as well as personal banking through its digital arm, EQ Bank. Founded in 1970 as The Equitable Trust Company, it became a Schedule I Bank in 2013 and has since grown to become Canada's seventh largest bank by assets.

EQ Bank was Canada's first digital bank, serving more than 578,000 customers across Canada. EQ Bank has been recognized as the Top Schedule I Bank in Canada by Forbes World's Best Banks for three years in a row (2021, 2022, and 2023).

As of 2023, Equitable Bank had over $31 billion in deposits and over $111 billion in combined assets under management and administration. It offers a range of financial solutions, including mortgages, business financing, and bank accounts. It operates from its headquarters in Toronto and has regional offices in Calgary, Halifax, Montreal, and Vancouver. Its parent company, EQB Inc., is a publicly traded company on the Toronto Stock Exchange under the symbol EQB (TSX: EQB) and a member of the Canada Deposit Insurance Corporation.

== History ==
Equitable Bank was founded under the name The Equitable Trust Company in 1970 in Hamilton, Ontario, Canada. The Trust company was headquartered at 1 James Street South. By 1990, The Equitable Trust Company became an operating company with $50 million in assets and four employees in its Toronto office.

In 2004, Equitable Group Inc. was created as the holding company of The Equitable Trust Company and was listed on the Toronto Stock Exchange.

Andrew Moor was appointed president and chief executive officer in March 2007.

On July 1, 2013, The Equitable Trust Company was renamed Equitable Bank and became a Schedule I Bank offering savings products such as Guaranteed Investment Certificates, Tax-Free Savings Accounts, and High Interest Savings Accounts.

On June 6, 2022, Equitable Group, the holding company for Equitable Bank, changed its legal name to EQB, aligning itself with its subsidiaries.

In July 2022, Equitable Bank announced it would migrate its banking systems onto Microsoft Azure cloud infrastructure, following its digital banking platform EQ Bank. The company aims to completely transition to the cloud by 2026.

On June 24, 2025 it was reported that CEO, Andrew Moor, died at the age of 65. He was the longest-serving bank CEO in Canada.

=== Expansion ===
Equitable Bank launched a direct banking operation branded as EQ Bank on January 14, 2016. As a completely online banking service, EQ Bank has no branch locations. At launch the bank attracted customers with the Savings Plus Account, a high-interest savings account with interest rate of 3.0%.

=== Acquisitions ===
On January 1, 2019, Equitable Bank completed its acquisition of Bennington Financial Services Corp, a growing privately owned company serving the brokered equipment leasing market in Canada.

In November 2022, EQB closed its acquisition of Concentra Bank (majority then owned by SaskCentral) in a deal worth $495 million, which, according to Equitable Bank, made it Canada's seventh largest bank. Concentra operated under the Wyth Financial brand, which will be replaced by the EQ Bank brand.

On December 3, 2025, EQB announced it had agreed to acquire President's Choice Financial from Loblaw Companies with the deal expected to close in 2026. The acquisition was completed on July 1, 2026.

== Products and services ==
=== Residential products ===
- Reverse mortgage
- Home Equity Line of Credit (HELOC)

=== Commercial products ===
- Business mortgage lending

==== Savings products ====
- Term deposits and Guaranteed Investment Certificates (GIC)
- High-Interest Savings Accounts (HISA)

=== Insurance lending ===
- The Equitable Bank CSV FLEX Line of Credit
- The Equitable Bank Immediate Financing Agreement

== EQ Bank ==
EQ Bank
- Product type: Direct banking
- Country: Canada
- Introduced: January 14, 2016; 10 years ago
- Website: eqbank.ca

EQ Bank launched on January 14, 2016, as a direct banking operation of Equitable Bank. As a completely online banking service, EQ Bank has no branch locations. It does not offer cheques to its customers. EQ Bank is CDIC insured under Equitable Bank.

The primary product offered by EQ Bank is the Savings Plus Account, a high-interest savings account with no monthly fees. All of EQ Bank's products require a Savings Plus Account.

At launch the bank attracted customers with an interest rate of 3.0% on its Savings Plus Account. The rate was lowered on April 18, just 96 days later, to 2.25%. The rate was lowered again to 2.0% on August 25, 2016. In May 2017 the rate was raised to 2.3%. From January to March 2020, the rate peaked at 2.45% before being reduced to 2.0% in response to reductions of the Bank of Canada interest rates due to the economic impact of the COVID-19 pandemic. The Savings Plus Account interest rate continued to reduce periodically, hitting a low of 1.25% in July 2021. In April 2022, EQ Bank began incrementally increasing its interest rate over a period of several months. As of October 2022, the interest rate for the Savings Plus Account is 2.50%.

EQ Bank began offering guaranteed investment certificates (GICs) in May 2018. The bank offers GICs from 3-month to 10-year terms.

EQ Bank moved its core banking system onto Microsoft Azure cloud infrastructure in November 2019. EQ Bank is the first bank in Canada to be hosted in the cloud.

In 2019, it launched an international money transfer service in partnership with TransferWise (now known as Wise). On February 6, 2020, the bank announced the addition of 15 new currencies, allowing conversions of over 40+ countries.

The Joint Savings Plus Account, which allows customers to invite up to three other people, for a total of four account co-holders, was introduced in July 2020.

The EQ Bank Tax-Free Savings Account (TFSA) and the EQ Bank Retirement Savings Plan (RSP) were introduced in December 2020. Both products have no fees and can be opened online.

In May 2021, EQ Bank announced the launch of its Mortgage Marketplace, a digital service that will allow customers to shop over 2,000 mortgage products offered by various Canadian lenders. In partnership with nesto, a digital mortgage brokerage, users can be pre-qualified for a mortgage online and receive regular digital updates on the status of their application.

EQ Bank launched the EQ Bank US Dollar Account in June 2021. The no-fee account gives EQ Bank customers the ability to send US dollars internationally.

In January 2023, EQ Bank announced the launch of the EQ Bank Card, a prepaid reloadable Mastercard. The card features no foreign exchange fee and free ATM withdrawals within Canada; fees are refunded within 10 business days. At launch, the EQ Bank Card offered a 0.5% cashback rate, with the card balance earning interest at the same rate as the Savings Plus Account.

As of December 2025, EQ Bank has 607,000 customers and $9.9B in deposits. This follows the milestones of $5 billion in February 2021, preceded by $3 billion and $4 billion of deposits, both achieved in 2020.

In December 2025, EQ Bank announced that it had entered into an agreement with Loblaws to acquire their PC Financial arm for nearly $800 million.

=== Products and services ===
- Personal Account (Previously, High Interest Saving Account)
- Joint Account (Previously, Joint Savings Plus Account)
- EQ Bank US Dollar Account
- Mortgage Marketplace
- EQ Bank Tax-Free Savings Account
- EQ Bank Retirement Savings Plan
- EQ Bank First Home Savings Account
- EQ Bank Card
- International money transfers
- Guaranteed Investment Certificates (GIC)
- Notice Saving Accounts (10 Days and 30 Days)
- Small Business Banking Accounts (Launching soon)

=== Controversy ===
Upon launch, demand for EQ Bank's 3% interest rate offer overwhelmed the bank's operations, leading to long customer service wait times and delays in account activations. In March 2016, within three months of launch, it began to limit the number of people who could sign up for and then, implemented a reservation system on its website. A limited number of people would then be invited to sign up every week.

CEO Andrew Moor admitted to underestimating the response from Canadians.

=== Awards ===
In April 2021, EQ Bank was named the #1 Bank in Canada on the Forbes list of World's Best Banks 2021. The World's Best Banks were selected based on over 43,000 consumer surveys representing 28 different countries.

In April 2022, EQ Bank was named the #1 Bank in Canada on the Forbes list of World's Best Banks 2022.

In April 2023, EQ Bank was named the #1 Bank in Canada on the Forbes list of World's Best Banks 2023. This is the third year in a row that EQ Bank has been awarded best bank in Canada.
