= Northland Bank =

Alberta-based Canadian bank, closed in 1985

- Industry: Bank
- Founded: 1974
- Defunct: 1985
- Fate: Bank failure
- Headquarters: Calgary, Alberta, Canada
- Area served: Western Canada

Northland Bank was an Alberta-based Canadian bank that failed in 1985. It was incorporated in 1974. It failed and was closed by the Canadian government shortly after the failure, also in 1985, of the Canadian Commercial Bank. The failures of both banks were the subject of a Commission of Inquiry headed by Supreme Court of Canada Justice Willard Estey, who issued his report in 1986.
