= Nova Scotian pound =

Historical currency of Nova Scotia

pound currency
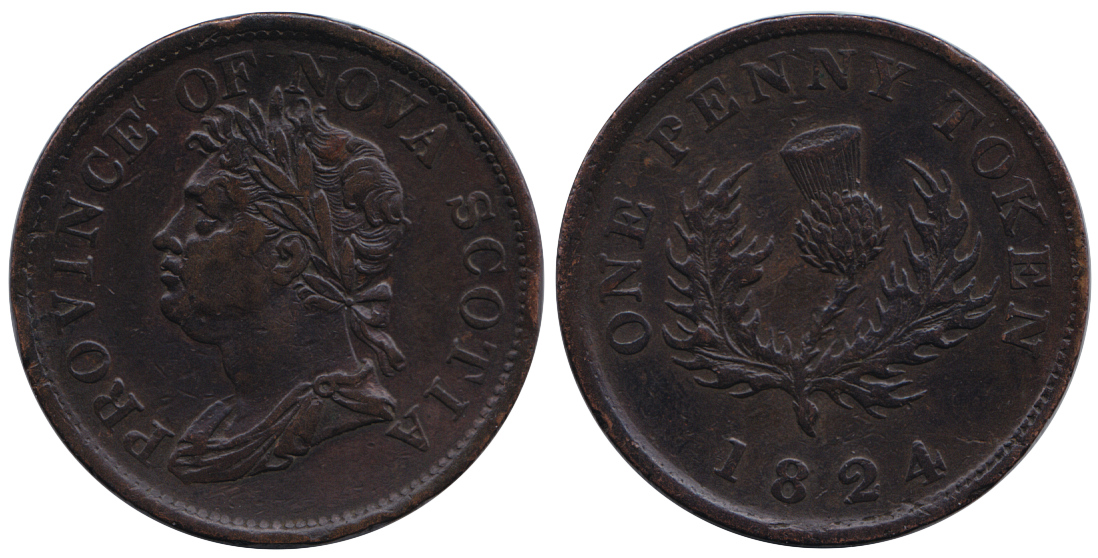
- Copper penny token minted for Nova Scotia in 1824. On the obverse is a portrait of King George IV.

Unit
- Plural: pounds
- Symbol: £

Denominations
- Subunit
- 1/20: shilling
- 1/240: penny
- Plural
- shilling: shillings
- penny: pence
- Symbol
- shilling: s or /–
- penny: d
- Banknotes
- Freq. used: 5s; 10s; £1; £2; £5; £10
- Rarely used: £1.10s; £2.10s; £5.5s; £6; £7; £7.10s; £12; £20; £50
- Coins: ½d; 1d

Demographics
- Date of introduction: ca. 1750
- Date of withdrawal: 1860
- Replaced by: Nova Scotian dollar
- User(s): Nova Scotia

Valuation
- Value: £1 = $4
- This infobox shows the latest status before this currency was rendered obsolete.

The pound currency (sign: £) was the currency of the British province of Nova Scotia from the 1750s until 1860. It was subdivided into 20 shillings (sign: s or /–), each of 12 pence (sign: d). The origins of a distinctly Nova Scotian currency began circa 1750, after a customary valuation of silver Spanish dollars was established at five shillings 'currency' in Halifax. This "Halifax rating" was the basis of the valuation of a number of foreign coins, or specie, which were used as the circulating medium of exchange. The Halifax rating of five shillings represented a sixpence increase in the valuation as compared to a dollar's value in sterling, thus creating an exchange rate of 9:10 between sterling and Nova Scotia currency (or £100 sterling = £111.11 Nova Scotian). This valuation was gradually replaced in the mid-1830s by a 100:125 exchange rate, which stood until the Nova Scotian dollar replaced it in 1860 at a rate of $4 = £1 (or $1 = 5/–).

== History ==
=== Origins ===
In the decades after Acadia was founded by the French in 1604, possession of the colony passed between the French and British multiple times, until invading forces from New England laid siege to the Acadian capital at Port-Royal and routed the French from peninsular Nova Scotia in 1710. The Treaty of Utrecht officially ceded control to the British in 1713.

Nova Scotia was effectively an outpost of the New Englanders, and they introduced Massachusetts currency to the region. The Massachusetts Bay Colony had introduced "bills of credit" beginning in 1690, which circulated widely as currency in New England. This paper money, also known as "Boston bills", was commonplace in colonial Nova Scotia in the first half of the 18th century. Boston bills were not backed by specie and overissuance of them caused high inflation and depreciation of Massachusetts currency. Until 1715 they were generally valued at about £150 Massachusetts currency per £100 sterling, but by 1720 the exchange rate had fallen to £220 per £100 sterling. By 1730 the rate had dropped to about £340 per £100 sterling, by 1740 it had dropped to £525 per £100 sterling, and by 1750 was worth £1000 per £100 sterling. In 1750 Massachusetts returned to the Spanish dollar as the basis of its currency at a rate of six shillings per dollar, and its paper currency was recalled.

The British made few serious attempts to colonize Nova Scotia other than occupying Annapolis Royal (on the site of the former Acadian capital) and a fishing village at Canso, until 1749. That year they chose to establish a new colonial capital and naval base at Halifax Harbour, a deeper natural harbour on the Atlantic coast rather than the shallow harbour emptying into the Bay of Fundy at Annapolis Royal. British settlement sparked Father Le Loutre's War, and thereafter the remaining Acadians fled or were expelled.

The establishment of the British military presence at Halifax significantly changed the demographics of the colony. The availability of hard currency (coins) greatly increased, and after Massachusetts retired its paper bills the Nova Scotians abandoned using them. The colonists chose to accept Spanish dollars as currency, as Massachusetts had, except instead of the six-shilling valuation used in New England the accepted rating in Halifax was five shillings currency per dollar. This Halifax rating was codified in law in 1758. Based on assays of dollars conducted in 1703 the value of a Spanish dollar was set at 4s 6d in Britain, thus the Halifax rating created a 9:10 exchange rate with sterling. This 1758 act was disallowed by the British home government in 1762, but the Halifax rating remained the customary valuation of Spanish dollars for decades thereafter.

=== Treasury notes ===
In the 1750s the colonial government began offering direct subsidies (also known as 'bounties') to settlers if they engaged in economic activities such as fishing and agriculture. The government had expected to pay for these subsidies using revenues from excise taxes and import duties on wine, spirits and beer, but the tax revenue fell far short of estimates, and by 1763 the colony was deeply in debt.

Rather than taking out loans the provincial surveyor, Charles Morris, suggested issuing a series of transferable, interest-bearing certificates. By 1768 over £20,000 worth of these "treasury notes" had been issued, and although they were not formally declared legal tender the colonial government encouraged their use as money. In 1765 tax collectors were instructed to take three-quarters of their collections in provincial treasury notes. The next year this was reduced to half their collections.

However, much as Boston bills were overissued and depreciated in value in the first half of the century, the value of the treasury notes began to fall. By 1767 the notes were valued at 25% lower than their face value. By 1774 they had depreciated to only half their face value. Despite this, in a 1775 address to the governor the House of Assembly estimated that only £1,200 of hard currency was circulating in the colony, while £20,000 worth of treasury notes were outstanding.

During the American Revolutionary War military spending by the imperial government brought in a significant amount of specie, but some of the wartime expenditures were borne by the colonial government, requiring the issuance of £5,000 of new treasury notes in 1779. After the war the government debt had been reduced from a peak of £23,000 in 1775 to about £15,000. The House of Assembly resolved in 1784 to retire all of the provincial debt by committing 10% of import duties and excise tax revenues to paying it down. The government resumed paying 'bounties' to settlers and the debt ballooned again to £22,500, but in 1792 new taxes were instituted to pay it down and by 1800 the entire debt had been retired and all treasury notes were withdrawn from circulation.

=== The War of 1812 ===
After the 1758 currency act was disallowed in 1762, Nova Scotia had no official legal tender until another currency act was passed in 1787. The 1787 act established ratings for British silver coins: the crown was rated at 5s 6d, the half-crown at 2s 9d, and the shilling at 1s 1d. Dollars were still customarily valued at five shillings. Guineas were not given an official rating, but the customary value assigned to them by merchants was £1 3s 4d. Similarly doubloons didn't have an official rating, but passed as £3 12s.

The supply of specie was insufficient to replace treasury notes as they were being withdrawn from circulation in the 1790s, and coin had to be shipped to the colony from Britain and the West Indies to pay troops stationed at the naval base in Halifax. By 1811 merchants had agreed to raise the accepted rate of doubloons from £3 12s to £3 17s 6d, to attract the shipment of the coins to Nova Scotia from the West Indies.

During the War of 1812 the supply of other coins, which had typically come from trading with markets in New York City, had been cut off. Hundreds of thousands of pounds' worth of coin was shipped from Bermuda and the West Indies to Halifax, but most of it was passed on to Quebec City to pay troops there. The war-induced shortage of coin was mitigated by the issuance of a new series of treasury notes, £20,000 worth, issued in denominations of 20 shillings (£1) up to £50, and bearing 6% interest. The entire 1812 issuance was recalled the following year and replaced with £14,000 worth of 20-shilling notes and £3,000 worth of 40-shilling (£2) notes. These 1813 notes did not bear interest, but were redeemable on the provincial treasury for gold or silver. They were widely accepted and continued to pass at face value, even after the war, and Halifax merchants petitioned the government to keep them in circulation in 1817.

=== Small change ===
Although treasury notes were widely accepted and alleviated the shortage of currency in larger denominations, because they were denominated for no less than 20 shillings (prior to 1820) they did nothing to alleviate a growing post-war shortage of small coins. Merchants began importing large quantities of copper penny and halfpenny tokens, while others began issuing their own personal scrip and promissory notes.

In 1817 the provincial government attempted to have a supply of copper halfpenny coins minted in England to drive out the spurious tokens and all other copper coins (except British pennies and halfpennies) that had appeared in circulation, but the imperial government disallowed the act, on the grounds that minting coins was a royal prerogative that the province did not possess. An 1818 act forbade chartered corporations from issuing their own promissory notes, although this did nothing to stop small business owners who weren't chartered.

The lack of small coins made simple transactions frustrating. In an 1820 letter to the editors of the Acadian Recorder one local recounted the story of buying a selection of vegetables at the market, carrying only a 20-shilling treasury note for payment. The first merchant the customer approached couldn't make change for the 20s note. A second merchant refused to sell, accepting only small coins in payment. A third agreed to sell the vegetables for 6d, but would have sold them half-price if the customer paid in "coppers" (halfpennies). The customer handed over the 20s note and received 93 separate pieces of change, composed of: eight promissory notes in denominations from 7 1/2d to 5s, one silver coin worth 7 1/2d ($1/8, one 'bit' of a "piece of eight"), and 84 halfpennies. The letter lamented "For God's sake, gentlemen, let us get back our DOLLARS!"

In the 1820-21 legislative session the House of Assembly passed two acts to alleviate the issue: the first act prohibited all promissory notes and bills of exchange for less than 26 shillings, unless evidence of a genuine debt was provided, and the second act provided for the issuance of 8,000 ten-shilling treasury notes and 16,000 five-shilling notes. The province also ordered copper and silver coins to be made, but once again the British home government wouldn't allow the minting of provincial coins. However, the British relented in 1823 and allowed copper penny and halfpenny tokens to be minted to resolve the shortage.

=== New sterling par ===
Confidence in treasury notes was shattered in February, 1825, when a large number of forgeries had been discovered. To salvage their credibility the government recalled all treasury notes and reviewed them for their authenticity; genuine notes were stamped, while forged notes were destroyed. The total value of notes in circulation was reduced by half, from about £60,000 to £30,000.

Coincidentally the imperial government passed an order-in-council in March, 1825 directing that all British soldiers across the empire were to be paid only in British silver or copper coinage. To encourage the use of British silver instead of Spanish dollars the British authorities also reduced the accepted value of the dollar, from 4s 6d sterling to 4s 4d. British silver was also required to purchase bills of exchange on London, one of the province's primary sources of credit, and so the attempt to encourage the circulation of British coins had the opposite effect: British coinage that was imported to pay the troops soon left circulation and was exported back to the UK to buy bills of exchange.

The attempt to force the colonies to use British coinage was further reinforced in 1827 by an order that imperial customs duties could only be paid in British coins or silver dollars valued at 4s 4d sterling. In Nova Scotia and New Brunswick the lack of British and Spanish silver in circulation made it practically impossible to follow this directive. The provincial governments successfully lobbied the British treasury to accept doubloons instead, and the idea of British coins circulating around the colonies was quietly dropped. However, doubloons were only accepted by the treasury at the market rate of $15.50. Doubloons (and parts thereof) had been far and away the most popular coins in circulation after 1819, when the accepted rate for them was raised from £3 17s 6d ($15.50) to £4 ($16). The imperial directive to accept them at only $15.50 put deflationary pressure on treasury notes—the only accepted medium of exchange actually denominated in Nova Scotia currency—as a doubloon could still be used to buy £4 currency but neither doubloons nor treasury notes would be accepted at £4 at the customs office or commissary at the naval base.

The order-in-council setting the sterling value of a dollar at 4s 4d instead of the previous 4s 6d caused considerable confusion as to what the proper currency ratings from British silver ought to be. With Nova Scotia currency still worth 5s per dollar, then a British crown, worth 5s sterling, should have been passing for about 5s 9 1/4d currency, instead of the nominal value of 5s 6d dictated by the currency act of 1787. A British shilling, nominally rated at 1s 1d currency, should have passed for between 1s 1 1/2d and 1s 2d. Merchants received British silver at these differing rates, until in 1830 provincial officials began receiving shillings at 1s 3d and sixpences at 7.5d. This revised rating was made law in 1834, and a customs act passed that year dictated that provincial duties were to be collected in sterling rather than provincial currency, with 20-shilling treasury notes valued at 16 shillings sterling, and doubloons passing for 80 shillings currency were to be accepted at 64 shillings sterling. This set a revised exchange rate between Nova Scotia currency and sterling at 125:100, instead of the old Halifax rating of 111.11:100. This ratio wasn't applied uniformly to all British coinage, as crowns and half-crowns were passing at only a 20% premium over sterling instead of 25%. This was rectified in 1836, with a revised rating of 6s 3d per crown.

=== Decimalization ===
By 1850 the House of Assembly had convened a currency committee, who recommended the introduction of a common currency with New Brunswick and Canada. In June, 1851 Provincial Secretary Joseph Howe travelled to Toronto to meet with representatives from Canada and New Brunswick, and they all agreed to urge the adoption of a common currency between them. New Brunswick and Canada homogenized their ratings in 1854, making their currency easily convertible to US dollars, but Nova Scotia did not.

Bills to reform Nova Scotian currency were introduced in 1856, 1857 and 1858 but they did not pass. One of the 1858 acts was reintroduced in 1859 and passed, dictating that all account were to be kept in dollars and cents beginning January 1, 1860. The act also permitted keeping a second column on account ledgers in pounds/shillings/pence. The use of sterling notation was abolished soon afterward by another act making the decimal system mandatory.

The Nova Scotian dollar effectively replaced the pound currency in 1860, at a rate of $4 per pound. Despite decimalizing, the new dollar wasn't harmonized with the New Brunswick and Canadian dollars. Whereas the New Brunswick and Canadian dollars were established at par with the US dollar, $4.86 2/3 equal to £1 sterling, the Nova Scotian dollar was equal to $5.00 per pound sterling, in keeping with the revised par established in the 1830s.

== Tokens ==
In addition to British coins, copper tokens were issued in 1823 and 1856 in denominations of ½d and 1d.

== Banknotes ==
In 1812, the provincial government introduced treasury notes in denominations of 20 shillings (£1), £2 10s, £5, £12, £20 and £50. The 1812 notes were withdrawn in 1813 and replaced with 20 and 40-shilling (£2) notes. 5/– and 10/– notes were issued in 1820, and thereafter were predominantly denominated in £1.

The Halifax Banking Company was incorporated in 1825, and although it wasn't chartered (until 1872), it issued paper money soon after operations began. The rival Bank of Nova Scotia was chartered in 1832 and issued its own notes as well. An 1820 act limited the issuance of private notes to sums larger than 26 shillings, so notes were denominated in £1 10s, £2, £2 10s, £5 and £10. An act of 1833 limited the issuance of private bank notes to denominations of at least £5, so the smaller denominations disappeared, but unusual denominations were issued to help facilitate making change. The Halifax Banking Company issued £5, £6, £6 10s and £7 10s notes, whilst the Bank of Nova Scotia began issuing notes in denominations of £5 5s, £6, £7, £7 10s, and £10.

== See also ==
- Nova Scotian dollar
- Canadian pound
- Canadian dollar

== Bibliography ==
- Krause, Chester L.; Clifford Mishler (1991). Standard Catalog of World Coins: 1801–1991 (18th ed.). Krause Publications. ISBN 0873411501.
- Pick, Albert (1990). Bruce, Colin R. II; Shafer, Neil (eds.). Standard Catalog of World Paper Money: Specialized Issues (6th ed.). Krause Publications. ISBN 0-87341-149-8.
