= New Brunswick pound =

Currency of New Brunswick until 1860

New Brunswick pound (Canadian English)

Units of account
- Plural: pounds
- Symbol: £
- Subunit
- 1/20: shilling
- 1/240: penny
- 1/480: sou
- Plural
- shilling: shillings
- penny: pence
- sou: sous
- Symbol
- shilling: s or /–
- penny: d

Demographics
- Date of introduction: 1841
- Date of withdrawal: 1860
- Replaced by: New Brunswick dollar
- User(s): New Brunswick

Valuation
- Value: £1 = $4
- This infobox shows the latest status before this currency was rendered obsolete.

The pound was the currency of New Brunswick until 1860. It was divided into 20 shillings, each of 12 pence, with the dollar (initially the Spanish dollar) circulating at a value of 5/– (the Halifax rating).

== History ==
In 1852, New Brunswick adopted the same standard for its pound as the Province of Canada was using, with £1 stg. = £1/4s/4d local currency (see Canadian pound). The pound was replaced by the dollar in 1860, at a rate of 1 dollar = 5 shillings.

== Coins ==
In addition to sterling coin and Spanish dollars, copper tokens were issued in 1834 and 1854 in denominations of 1/2d and 1d.

== Banknotes ==
Five chartered banks issued notes, the Bank of Fredericton (1837-1838), the Bank of New Brunswick (1820-1860), the Central Bank of New Brunswick (1847-1860), the Charlotte County Bank (1852-1859) and the Commercial Bank of New Brunswick (1837-1860). Denominations issued were 5/–, 7/– and 10/–, £1, £2, £3, £5, £10 and £25. Some of the Bank of New Brunswick and Central Bank of New Brunswick's notes also bore the denomination in dollars.

== See also ==
- New Brunswick dollar
