= Canadian pound =

Unit of account in Canada from 1760 to 1858

pound currency
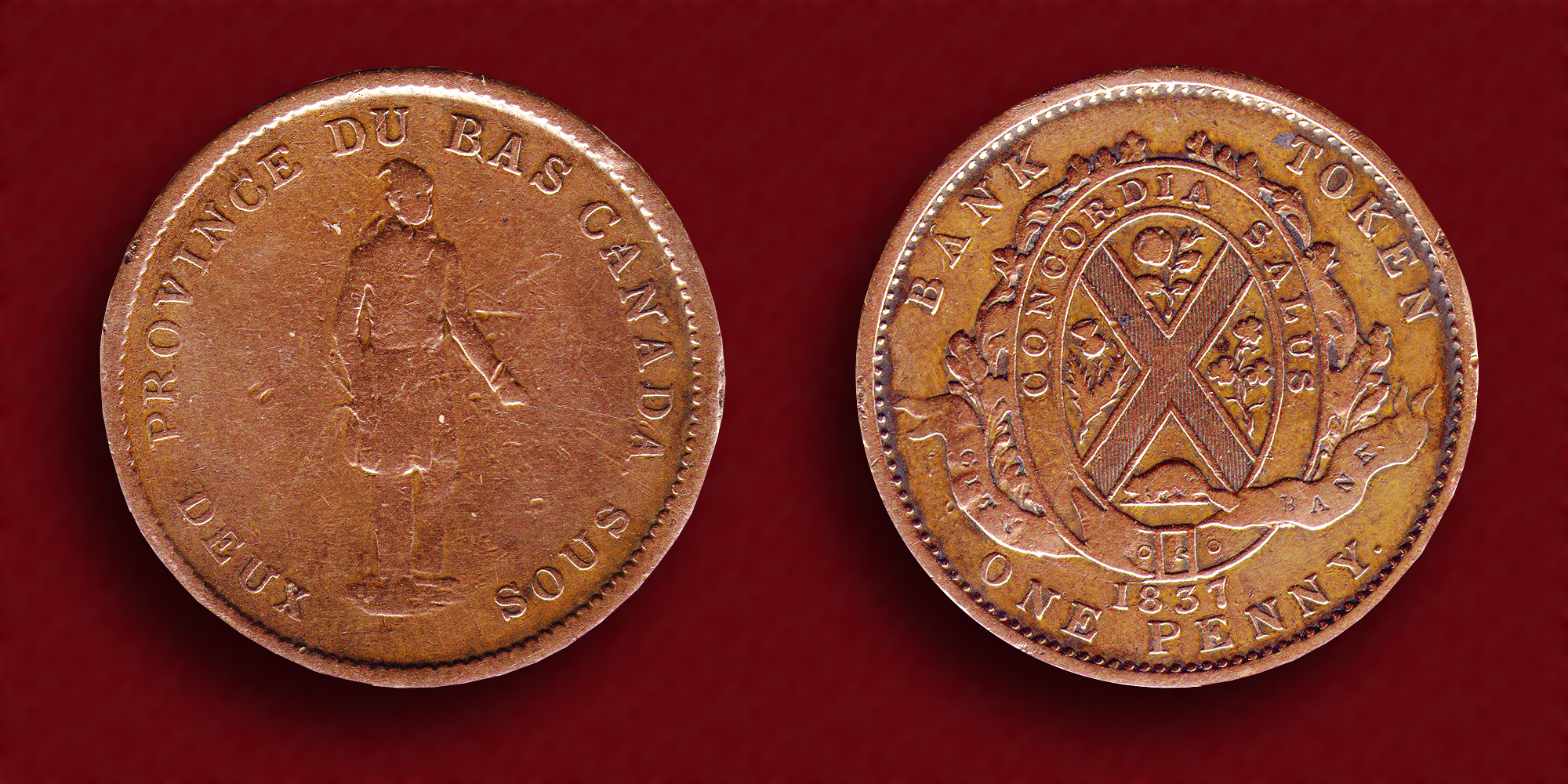
- 1-penny (2-sou) bank token (1837)

Units of account
- Plural: pounds
- Symbol: £
- Subunit
- 1/20: shilling
- 1/240: penny
- 1/480: sou (French) (informal)
- Plural
- shilling: shillings
- penny: pence
- sou (French): sous
- Symbol
- shilling: s or /–
- penny: d

Demographics
- Date of introduction: ca. 1760
- Date of withdrawal: 1858
- Replaced by: Canadian dollar
- User(s): Province of Canada

Valuation
- Value: £1 = $4
- This infobox shows the latest status before this currency was rendered obsolete.

The pound currency (symbol £) was the unit of account in the French colony of Canada while under British military governorship, the Province of Quebec (1763–1791), Lower Canada and Upper Canada (1791–1841), and the Province of Canada (1841–1867), from the British conquest of New France until its replacement by the Canadian dollar in 1858. It was subdivided into 20 shillings (s), each of 12 pence (d). It was not a circulating currency, insofar as no coins or banknotes denominated in "Canadian pounds" (nor its subunits) were issued by a monetary authority.

Rather, local custom and law set exchange rates against foreign specie, and that foreign money was used as the circulation medium. These "ratings" varied over time but the most commonly used during this period was the "Halifax rating", established at Halifax, Nova Scotia in the 1750s, which set the value of one Spanish dollar equal to five shillings "Halifax currency". This represented a premium of sixpence more than British tests conducted ca. 1703 that had established an average Spanish dollar coin's weight in silver was equal to 4s 6d sterling. Foreign coins were typically overvalued in this manner to encourage the coinage to circulate and as such Canadian pounds currency were never at par with British pounds sterling.

== History ==
=== Origins ===
In British North America, the colonies lacked the authority to mint their own money, so foreign coins were used as circulating currency. Each colony managed their monetary supply by setting valuations or "ratings" for foreign coins in their pounds/shillings/pence accounting systems, fixing a value for the coins, relative to a pound unit. In particular the use of Spanish dollars in day-to-day transactions was commonplace, but each colony set its own valuation, which varied significantly: in the mid-18th century one dollar was valued at 4s 6d in Britain, but at 5s in Halifax, 6s in New England, 7s 6d in Pennsylvania and 8s in New York.

In New France, the French forces' expenditures rose significantly over the duration of the Seven Years' War, and the continued war effort had to be financed by the colonial government's issuance of paper bills of exchange. The French government issued a decree suspending the payment of bills of exchange drawn on the colonial treasury on October 15, 1759, news of which did not reach New France until June 1760, and it caused a financial panic. After the French failed to retake Quebec City, the British military governor, General James Murray, forbade the circulation of this rudimentary paper money and introduced Halifax currency—one Spanish dollar was equal to five shillings currency—to Quebec City. After General Amherst's army captured Montreal and New France fell to British forces, Amherst similarly introduced York currency to Montreal, as did Burton at Trois-Rivières, at eight shillings per dollar. Murray was named the civil governor of the new Province of Quebec in 1763, and set a separate rating of six shillings per dollar effective January 1, 1765. This Quebec rating wasn't strictly enforced, and the use of the Halifax and York ratings persisted alongside the new rating until it was repealed in favour of the Halifax rating's official use across the province in 1777.

Murray's ordinance set ratings for not only the Spanish dollar but a wide variety of foreign coins, including Portuguese "Johannes" and moidores, French Louis d'or and écus, Spanish pistoles and pistareens, and British guineas, shillings and "coppers" (halfpennies). Halfpennies and old French colonial sols marqués were deliberately undervalued to prevent the importation of excessive amounts of copper coins, while French gold and silver coins were deliberately overvalued to discourage hoarding and keep them circulating. Gold coins were generally undervalued relative to silver coins, so silver coins came to dominate circulation. Because of the undervaluation of copper coins they disappeared from circulation and it became difficult for merchants to make change for small purchases. Instead, merchants resorted to issuing their own paper scrip known by the nickname bons, after the words bon pour (French for 'good for') which often appeared as the first words on them.

To rectify the lack of small coins and encourage the circulation of gold coinage, the 1765 ordinance was superseded by a new one in 1777. The value of gold coins was reduced and a rating for Spanish doubloons was added, while value of the dollar was set at the Halifax rating of five shillings and other silver coins' ratings were commensurately reduced. The 1777 ordinance also rectified the overvaluation of many of the old coins rated in the 1765 ordinance; coins such as the moidore and écu hadn't been issued since the 1720s and 1730s, and by 1777 would have been quite worn. Clipping and sweating of Spanish and Portuguese coins has also been rampant in the Thirteen Colonies to the south, and trade with the colonies had been a major source of coins for the Canadians.

The American Revolutionary War interrupted the trade with the colonies, but with the influx of British Army soldiers the British government also shipped hundreds of thousands of pounds' worth of coins. Commercial activity in Canada increased many times over, but by war's end prices fell causing many bankruptcies. Payments to British Army soldiers and for imported materiel caused the gradual depletion of coins in the monetary supply. The colonists resorted to bartering, book credits, and the continued usage of bons.

After the Constitutional Act 1791 split the Province of Quebec into Lower Canada and Upper Canada, they were free to set their own ratings of coinage, but these were generally the same throughout both provinces after parallel legislation was passed in 1796, 1808 and 1809.

=== Paper money and commercial banks ===
After the American Revolutionary War trade between the new independent United States and the Canadas resumed. Canadians imported material goods from the States, while selling agricultural product and raw goods to Great Britain, creating a flow of British money from Great Britain to Canada to the United States. The money would flow back to Canada again through the trade of sterling bills of exchange in markets in New York and Boston. This system kept a steady supply of money in the Canadas until the War of 1812 interrupted trade with the US. With the US supply of coinage effectively cut off and the demand for specie significantly increased by military expenditures to pay soldiers to carry on the war, the Canadas were faced with a currency shortage. Lower Canada turned to selling bills of exchange in the Caribbean through intermediaries in Halifax, but this was not sufficient to increase the money supply.

Instead, the Legislative Assembly of Lower Canada introduced a form of paper money known as "army bills" in August 1812. The issuance of up to £250,000 currency was approved, in series of 'small' and 'large' bills. The small bills, denominated in $4 (equivalent to £1 currency), were not interest-bearing and were payable on cash in Quebec City. The large bills, upwards of $25, paid 4% interest and were redeemable in bills of exchange on London. To encourage the use of the bills the export of gold, silver and copper was made illegal and any contract in the province which did not recognise the army bills as equivalent to coin was rendered void. The amount of the 1812 issuance was soon found to be inadequate, and the maximum issuance was raised to £500,000 in 1813, with £50,000 worth issued in a new series of small bills in $1, $2, $8, $10, $12 and $16 denominations.

The army bills proved to be popular, and Upper Canada made them legal tender in 1813. The Legislative Assembly of Upper Canada authorised the issuance of up to £100,000 worth of its own army bills, but none were issued. In 1814 Lower Canada raised the limit on bills up to £1.5 million, £500,000 of which was authorised for another series of $1, $2, $3, $5 and $10 small bills that were not payable in cash, but could be redeemed for bills of exchange or for larger interest-bearing bills.

After the war the interest on the bills was paid by 1817, and export limits on gold, silver and copper were lifted. The success of the army bills demonstrated that paper money could be issued responsibly, and a group of Montreal merchants incorporated the Montreal Bank (later renamed the Bank of Montreal) in June 1817 and opened their first branch in November of that year. The next year the Bank of Canada (in Montreal) and Quebec Bank were founded, and soon after the Bank of Upper Canada was founded at York. By 1821 each of these banks received charters, and began issuing banknotes. The Bank of Montreal, Bank of Canada and Quebec Bank issued notes denominated in dollars, while the Bank of Upper Canada was the only one that began issuing notes denominated in shillings and pounds.

=== British monetary policy ===
Older coins such as the pistareen and pre-revolutionary French half-écus were the prevailing smaller coinage in Lower Canada even well into the 19th century. These coins had been debased by age-related wear, and to add to monetary supply in the province Lower Canada made the (post-revolutionary) 40-franc, 20-franc and 5-franc coins legal tender in 1819. Upper Canada did not.

In 1825, an Imperial Order-in-Council was made for the purposes of causing sterling coinage to circulate in the British colonies. The only acceptable method of payment to British soldiers and for customs charges was in sterling specie, or Spanish dollars at 4s 4d. The intention of the order-in-council was to make the sterling coins legal tender at the exchange rate of 4s 4d per Spanish dollar. This rate was in fact unrealistic and it had the adverse effect of actually driving out what little sterling-specie coinage was already circulating. Upper Canada attempted to rectify this by increased the rating of British crowns to 5s 9d currency and shillings to 1s 2d currency in 1826, and more comprehensively revised its ratings of currencies in 1836. French and Portuguese coins were demonetized, as were Spanish doubloons and pistoles, while the value of the Spanish dollar was set at 4s 6d and gold British sovereigns and U.S. eagles were made legal tender (at 1/4/4 and 2/10/0, respectively).

By contrast, Lower Canada did nothing to encourage the use of sterling coinage. Remedial legislation was introduced in 1838 but it was not applied to the British North American colonies due to recent uprisings in Upper and Lower Canada.

=== Reunification and decimalization ===
In 1841, the Canadas were amalgamated into the united Province of Canada, and the new government adopted a new consolidated rating system. The new ratings took effect on 27 April 1842, and demonetized the old French coins once and for all. Gold coins from Portugal, Brazil, France, Spain, Mexico and Colombia were made legal tender, but only by weight. The only gold coins specifically given a rating were British sovereigns (1/4/4) and American eagles (2/13/4 for coins minted prior to July 1834; 2/10/0 for coins minted thereafter). The French 5-franc coin, British crowns, half-crowns, shillings and sixpences, and Spanish, U.S., Mexican, Chilean, Peruvian and other Central American and South American silver dollars and fractional currency thereof were also given ratings. The ratings of silver coins were increased, with dollars set to 5s 1d currency, crowns at 6s 1d, and shillings at 1s 2.5d.

This created an inequity in the valuations of eagles compared to dollars, and between crowns, shillings and sixpences. With a crown valued as 6s 1d currency, a shilling should have consequently been valued at 1s 2.6d. The 1s 2.5d rating of a shilling was close, but for practicality's sake many merchants took them in trade at 1s 3d. With dollars rated at 5s 1d that meant that $10 was equal to 50s 10d (or 2/10/10) currency, but eagle coins—which were worth US$10—were valued at 50 shillings currency (2/10/0). This premium on dollars had the effect of causing Canadians to export eagle coins out of the province and import silver American dollars in exchange.

The impracticality using the new ratings in a pounds/shilling/pence system, where transactions would commonly involve fractions of a penny, made the idea of a decimalized currency similar to the American dollar popular. Banknotes from chartered banks were already commonly denominated in dollars, and merchants found the system much more easy. The committee that had drafted the new currency law had called 23 witnesses from the banks and industry, and when asked which system they would prefer 11 preferred sterling, 10 preferred a decimalized dollar, and two preferred retaining the Halifax rating.

The inequities introduced in the 1841 legislation were not rectified until 1850, when the value of a dollar was reset to the old Halifax rating of five shillings. That year the U.S. government had reduced their accepted exchange rate for Spanish and Mexican quarter (2 reales), eighth (1 real) and sixteenth (1/2 real) dollar coins by about 20% and demonetized other foreign coins, so the Canadian government reduced their ratings for the fractional dollar coinage as well, dropping the ratings of the quarter dollar from 1s 3d to 1s, the eighth dollar from 7.5d to 6d, and the sixteenth dollar from 3.5d to 3d. The act would have also allowed for the minting of Canadian coins, but this wasn't assented to by the British government.

In 1851, the governments of Canada, New Brunswick and Nova Scotia met in Toronto and came to an agreement to work toward establishing a common decimal currency between them. Imperial authorities in London still preferred the idea of sterling to be the sole currency throughout the British Empire. The Canadian parliament passed an act directing that provincial accounts be kept in dollars and cents, with a dollar worth five shillings Halifax currency and the pound sterling equal to $4.86 2/3. The authorities in London refused to give assent to the act, hoping that the Canadians could still be persuaded to keep an £sd currency instead. A counterproposal from the British government presented a currency with three new decimal units as a compromise to the Canadian legislature: 10 "minims" would be worth 1 "mark", 10 "marks" worth 1 shilling, and 10 shillings worth 1 "royal". A "mark" thus would have been worth 1^{1}/_{5}d, and a "royal" would have been worth 2 crowns or half a pound.

Despite the push to move to a decimal currency, the earliest Canadian postage stamps introduced in 1851 were denominated in pence.

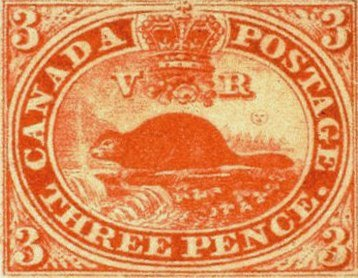
An 1851 Canadian 3d denomination postage stamp in £sd units of the Halifax rating

This contrived mix of decimal and sterling currency wasn't approved and the Legislative Assembly compromised in 1853, introducing the gold standard into Canada, with pounds, shillings, pence, dollars, cents and mills all legal for keeping government accounts. This gold standard re-affirmed the value of British gold sovereigns set in 1841 at £1.4s.4d in local currency, and the American gold eagle at $10 in local dollars. In effect this created a Canadian dollar at par with the United States dollar, and Canadian pound at US$4.86 2/3. No coinage was provided for under the 1853 act but gold eagles and sterling gold and silver coinage were legal tender. All other silver coins were demonetized. British pennies were rated at two cents, and halfpennies were rated at one cent.

In 1857, the Currency Act was amended and abolished accounts in pounds and the use of sterling coinage as legal tender, and dollars and cents—at par with the US dollar—were the only accepted units of account. New decimal 1¢, 5¢, 10¢, and 20¢ coins minted by the Royal Mint were put in circulation in 1858, and postage stamps were issued with decimal denominations for the first time in 1859. While British gold sovereigns and other gold coins continued to be legal tender, the pound currency ceased to exist as a unit of account, and was replaced by the new Canadian dollar.

== Tokens ==
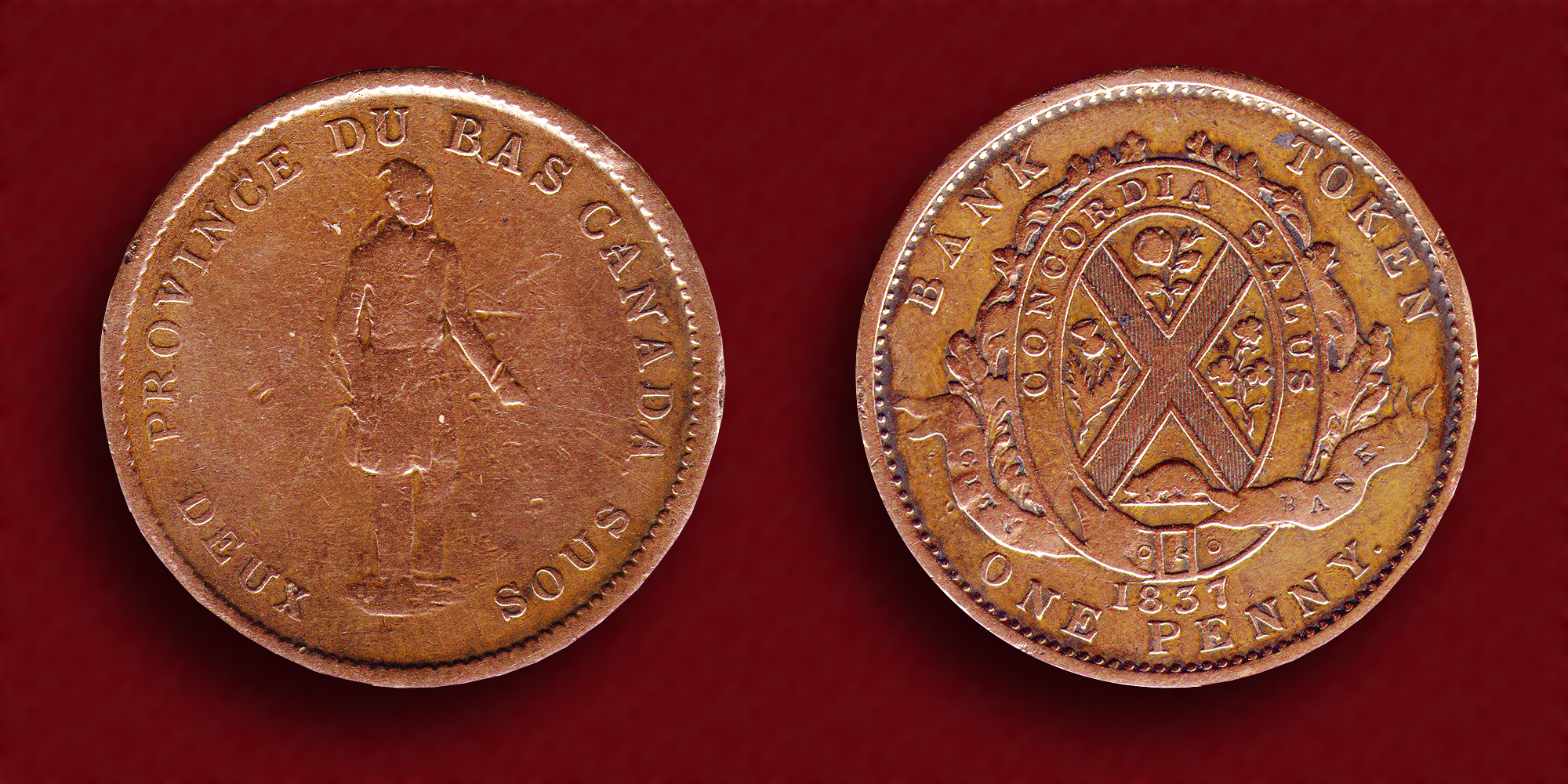
1d (2-sou) bank token issued by City Bank in Lower Canada in 1837

The only legal small-denomination copper coins were British halfpennies, but the supply of them was limited by the inequity between the value of pounds currency and pounds sterling. The Halifax rating set an effective exchange rate between the British pound sterling and Canadian pound currency at 9:10 (£100 GBP = £111.11 Canadian) but it was impossible to account for this difference in units as small as the penny and halfpenny. As such, British halfpennies could only circulate at face value, making importation of large quantities of copper coins a money-losing proposition. This drove copper coins in good condition out of Canada, with no reasonable way of legally replacing them. The halfpennies that were in circulation in the early 19th century were old and worn, consisting mostly of old British coins minted from 1770 to 1775 imported at the turn of the century, with some examples dating as far back as George II's reign decades earlier. Canadians were forced to make do with whatever analogues they could find, even resorting to using brass buttons from the uniforms of the Royal Fusiliers.

To supply change to customers merchants began importing token coins from England, despite the "importing or manufacturing spurious or base copper coin" being illegal. Merchants were debasing the tokens, and making counterfeits. By 1817 petitions from the citizens of Quebec City and Montreal circulated demanding that something be done to curb the oversupply of counterfeit and debased coinage. Crudely-made "blacksmith" tokens that superficially imitated the appearance of worn British and Irish halfpennies were commonplace. In the 1820s Joseph Tiffin, a prominent Montreal merchant, imported a large amount of English trade tokens bearing 1812 mint dates with the effigy of George III on the obverse and a woman seated on a bale of goods on the reverse.

By the 1830s the situation was untenable. Sir John Colborne, Lieutenant governor of Upper Canada, wrote to the British government requesting a supply of about £50,000 worth of halfpennies, but the treasury only supplied about £5,000 worth. The new coinage arrived in Quebec City in 1832, with a portion distributed to the Bank of Upper Canada, but British authorities insisted that the bank receive the coins at a value of 52d per Spanish dollar (the value established by the British order-in-council of 1825), while the bank insisted that they would only take them at the Halifax rating of 60d per dollar. The bank refused to accept the coins, and few ever entered circulation.

The Bank of Montreal stepped in and in 1835 commissioned the production of new tokens bearing the bank's name. These tokens, bearing a bouquet on the obverse and denominated in a value of un sou, were well received. In 1837 the bank commissioned another series of tokens, featuring an habitant on the obverse, and permission was given by British authorities to import the tokens from England if the rest of the chartered banks were allowed to issue them as well. La Banque du Peuple, the City Bank and the Quebec Bank issued 1- and 2-sou (1/2d and 1d) tokens of their own from 1835 to 1852, while the Bank of Upper Canada issued 1/2d and 1d tokens between 1850 and 1857.

Tokens were never legal tender, but from 1839, bank tokens were given privileged status by the provincial legislatures. Bank tokens were replaced by the provincial one cent coin in 1858.

== Banknotes ==
Banknotes were issued by the chartered banks, starting with the Montreal Bank (now the Bank of Montreal) in 1817. Most notes were denominated in dollars (or piastres, in French), or were double-denominated in dollars and pounds/shillings/pence, typically at the Halifax rating of five shillings per dollar. Many banks issued notes. Denominations included 5/– ($1), 10/– ($2), 15/– ($3), £1 ($4), £1 1/4 ($5), £2 1/2 ($10), £5 ($20), £12 1/2 ($50) and £25 ($100). In addition, small value "scrip" notes were issued in 1837 by the Quebec Bank, in denominations of 6d (12 sous), $1/4 (30 sous, 1s.3d.) and $1/2 (60 sous, 2s.6d.), and by Arman's Bank, in denominations of 5d, 10d and 15d (10, 20 and 30 sous).

== See also ==
- Bank of Canada
- Sterling area
- List of countries by leading trade partners
- Lists of Commonwealth of Nations countries by GDP
- List of countries by leading trade partners
- Canadian banknote issuers
