= Nova Scotian dollar =

Historical currency of Nova Scotia

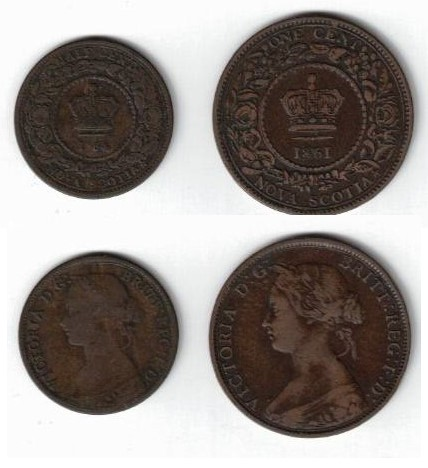
- Nova Scotia half-cent and one cent coins

Unit
- Symbol: $

Denominations
- Subunit
- 1/100: cent
- Symbol
- cent: ¢
- Banknotes: $5; $20
- Coins: ½¢; 1¢

Demographics
- Replaced: Nova Scotian pound
- Replaced by: Canadian dollar
- User(s): Nova Scotia

Valuation
- Value: $0.75 = Can$0.73
- This infobox shows the latest status before this currency was rendered obsolete.

The dollar was the currency of Nova Scotia between 1860 and 1871. It replaced the Nova Scotian pound at a rate of 4 dollars = 1 pound (or 1 dollar = 5 shillings). Prior to its replacement a Nova Scotian pound was valued at £1.25 = £1.00 sterling, so by extension £1 sterling was equal to $5 Nova Scotian, or $1 Nova Scotian was equal to 4 shillings sterling. Consequently the Nova Scotian dollar was worth less than the New Brunswick and Canadian dollars, which were each worth 4s 1.3d sterling. The Nova Scotian dollar was replaced by the Canadian dollar in 1871 at a rate of 73 Canadian cents = 75 Nova Scotian cents, thus reconciling the difference between the two currencies.

== Coins ==
Between 1861 and 1864, bronze ½ and 1 cent coins were issued. These were the only coins issued for the Nova Scotian dollar. A half-cent coin was required because British six-pence coins in circulation were valued at 12½ Nova Scotian cents.

== Banknotes ==
Between 1861 and 1866, the Provincial Government introduced Treasury notes for 5 dollars. In addition, three chartered banks issued paper money in Nova Scotia, the Bank of Nova Scotia, the Halifax Banking Company and the Merchants Bank of Halifax. The private banks all issued notes in a single denomination, 20 dollars. They later issued notes in Canadian dollars.

The Province of Canada issued notes dated 1866 overprinted with "Payable in Halifax / only". These were for circulation in Nova Scotia as local currency. Notes for 5 dollars were issued, worth $4.86 in Canadian currency.
