= City Bank of Montreal =

Canadian bank (1833–1876)

City Bank Banque de la Cité
- Type: Consumer bank
- Industry: Banking
- Founded: 1833; 193 years ago in Montreal, Quebec, Canada
- Defunct: 1876; 150 years ago
- Fate: Merged into Consolidated Bank of Canada in 1876; Merged into modern-day Canadian Imperial Bank of Commerce (CIBC)
- Successor: Consolidated Bank of Canada
- Headquarters: Montreal, Canada
- Areas served: Montreal; Quebec City; Toronto
- Key people: First President: John Frothingham

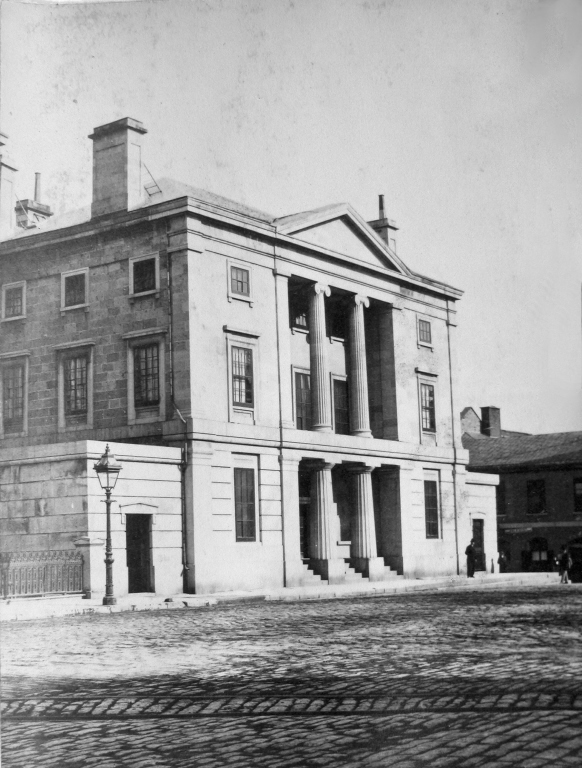
The bank's 1844 headquarters on Place d'Armes, designed by Cane, MacFarlane & Browne. It was remodeled in 1888 and demolished around 1912 to make way for the Royal Trust Company building.

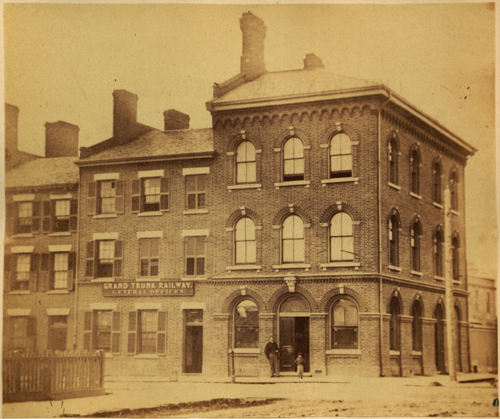
City Bank of Montreal, Toronto office

The City Bank of Montreal (known in French as "La Banque de la Cité") was an early bank founded in Montreal in 1833, when it was part of Lower Canada. It was founded as a counterpart to the Bank of Montreal, whose politically conservative directors made it difficult for leading liberals to do business in the province. During its existence, it issued a number of tokens for use in trade, and is known for producing many varieties of the Bouquet sou, and for co-issuing the Habitant token along with the other leading banks of Montreal in the late 1830s. It also issued paper money.

It also had branches in Toronto, and in Quebec City.

City Bank merged with Royal Canadian Bank to form Consolidated Bank of Canada in 1876.

== Bibliography ==
- Manning Garrett (12 September 2013). "The City Bank of Montreal Banknote Values - Canadian Currency".
- Grawey, Tim (December 12, 2017). "Colonial Tokens: City Bank tokens were issued during rebellions". Canadian Coin News. 55 (18): 13–15.
