= British Columbia dollar =

Currency of British Columbia from 1865 to 1871

Unit
- Symbol: $

Denominations
- Symbol
- Banknotes: $1; $5; $10; $20; $25; $50

Demographics
- Replaced: Pound sterling
- Replaced by: Canadian dollar
- User(s): Colony of British Columbia

Issuance
- Central bank: Department of Finance and Customs

Valuation
- Pegged with: Canadian dollar at par
- This infobox shows the latest status before this currency was rendered obsolete.

The dollar was the currency of the Colony of British Columbia between 1865 and 1871. It replaced the British pound at a rate of 1 pound per 4.866 dollars and was equivalent to the Canadian dollar, which replaced it. The dollar was subdivided into 100 cents. No distinct coins were issued, with Canadian coins circulating.

The dollar had already been adopted as the currency of the then-separate Colony of Vancouver Island in 1863. It therefore became the currency of the united colony formed in 1866.

This currency should not be confused with the 100th Anniversary of the Accession of British Columbia large dollar minted in 1971.

== Banknotes ==
Although the dollar was only adopted as the official currency of the colony in 1865, both treasury and chartered bank notes were introduced in 1862, denominated in dollars. The treasury notes were in denominations of 5, 10 and 25 dollars, whilst the banknotes, issued by the Bank of British Columbia, were in denominations of 1, 5, 20, 50 and 100 dollars.
