= Bouquet sou =

Trade coins primarily used in Lower Canada

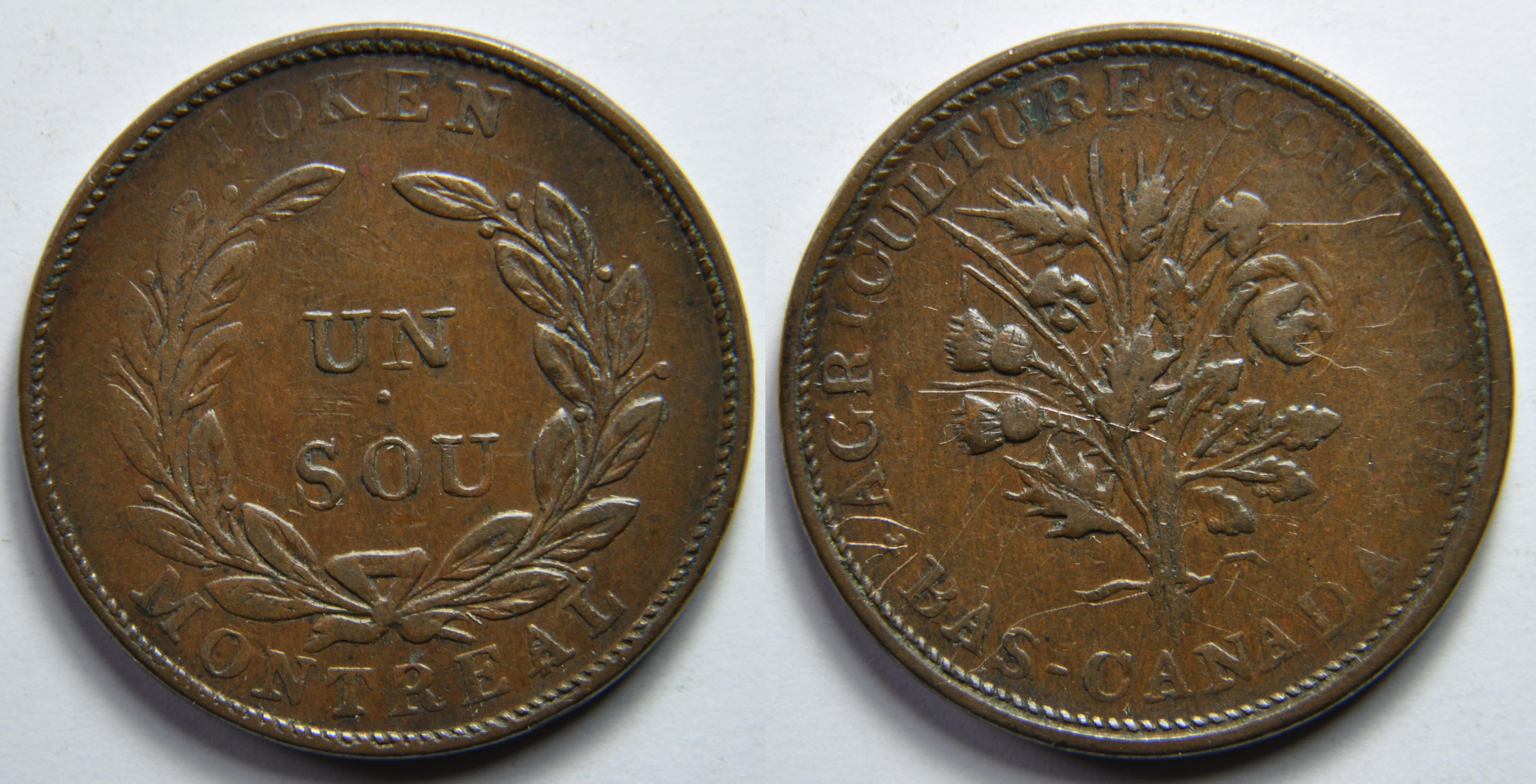
Obverse and reverse image of a typical "Bouquet Sou" Token, one side showing a wreath, "Token Montreal" its value, and the other side a bunch of heraldic flowers surrounded by the words "Agriculture & Commerce" and "Bas-Canada".

Bouquet sou were a series of tokens that were created for use primarily within Lower Canada in the mid- to late-1830s. Roughly equivalent in value to a half penny, the "bouquet sou" were so called because they displayed a group of heraldic flowers tied together with a ribbon on their obverse. The group of flowers were encircled by one of several legends, which might say "Trade & Agriculture / Lower Canada", "Agriculture & Commerce / Bas Canada" or some variant of these that might also substitute the name of the issuing bank. The other side most typically gave the denomination of "un sou", surrounded by a wreath and the words "Bank Token" and "Montreal". There are a large variety of these tokens, distinguished primarily by the number and variety of flowers that appear in the "bouquet", along with the differences in the legends that appeared on either side of the token. They were initially issued by the banks of Lower Canada, and were later imitated by speculators who produced tokens that looked similar, but were underweight for their denomination. These coins also circulated to Upper Canada, as at least one archeology dig attests. Large numbers of these tokens were produced and many examples can easily be obtained for only a few Canadian dollars, though a few rare varieties can command significantly higher prices.

== History ==
=== First bouquet sous ===
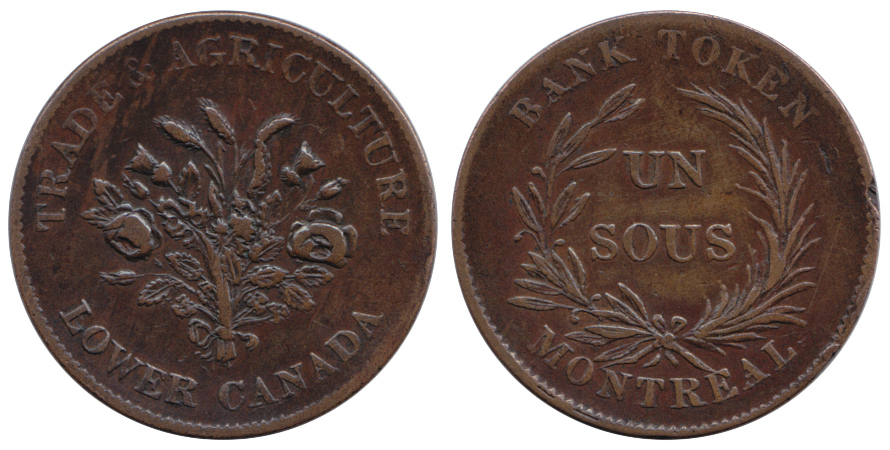
Both sides of the first "bouquet sou" token (Breton 713, LC-2), issued in 1835. This version includes the wrong spelling for "sou", here pluralized to "sous".

In both Lower and Upper Canada in the early 19th century, there was little in the way of circulating coinage, and merchants struggled to use what coinage there was available that came in a variety of denominations from numerous countries, including, England, the United States and Mexico. To remedy this situation, the Bank of Montreal issued the first bouquet sou token in July 1835. They were minted in New York State, and about 500,000 pieces were created. This first bouquet sou had a floral design consisting of shamrocks, roses, thistles and ears of wheat, surrounded by an inscription saying "Trade & Commerce / Lower Canada". The reverse depicts the denomination as "Un Sous", surrounded by a laurel wreath and the legend "Bank Token Montreal". The flowers and leaves used on the obverse represented the immigrant peoples of Lower Canada, the shamrock representing Ireland, the rose for England, the thistles a symbol for Scotland, and the wheat representing the staple crop of Quebec. The inscription for the denomination was in error, as in French it ought to have read "Un Sou", using the singular form of "sou", and it is thought that the dies for this initial design were engraved by a die maker not fluent in French. The next batch of these tokens issued by the Bank of Montreal included the name of the bank in place of "Bank Token Montreal", and it is thought that the original, anonymous legend was used as the bank had not yet received official permission from the provincial government to issue the tokens, which came the following year.

=== Belleville series ===
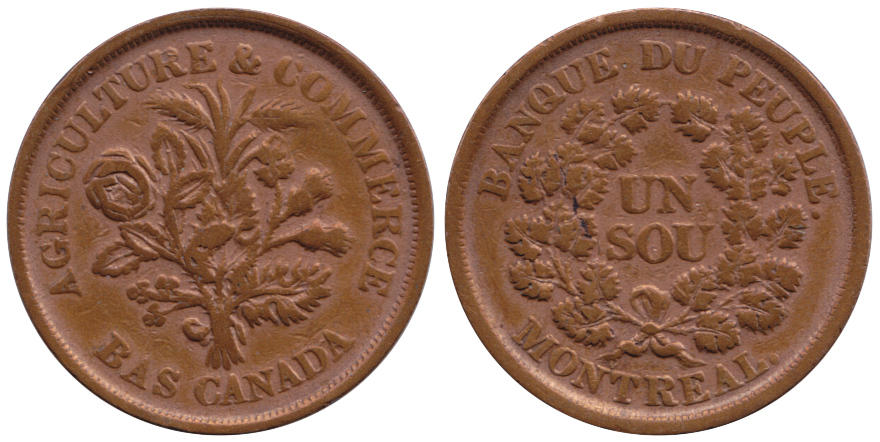
Bouquet sou minted at Belleville in 1838.

While the Montreal banks issued bouquet sou of the correct weight for their denomination, speculators began importing tokens of similar design but of slightly lower weight, thereby profiting from the difference in face value from the cost of having the coin made. The exchange broker Dexter Chapin imported a large quantity of bouquet sou that were minted in Belleville, New Jersey. At least 13 of these Belleville issued bouquet sou were created by this mint and then imported into Lower Canada. The initial issues came from dies cut by John Gibbs of the Belleville mint.

=== "Rebellion Sou" ===
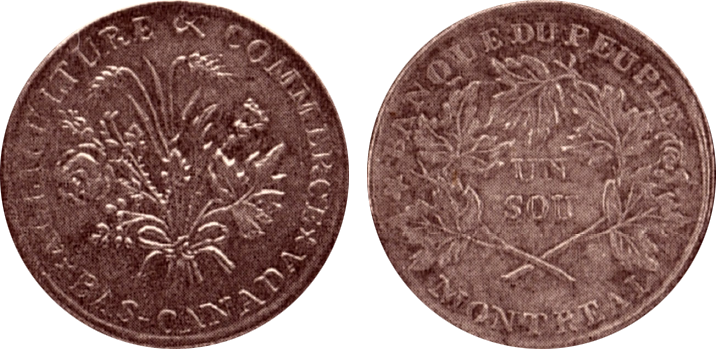
An example of a Bouquet Sou dating to the 1837 (the year of the Lower Canada rebellion), called the "Rebellion Sou" (Breton 716, LC-4), as it contains a star and liberty cap in its design.

On October 23–24, 1837, the Assembly of the Six Counties (French: Assemblée des six-comtés) was held in Saint-Charles, Lower Canada. It was an assembly of Patriote leaders and approximately 6,000 followers, protesting the Russell Resolutions. It was a prelude to the Lower Canada Rebellion of 1837. At this assembly a boycott was proposed for all English-produced goods along with the use of British coinage. As a result, the bouquet sou became popular within the province and became known as the "Sous des Patriotes".

In 1837 a new die was created for a bouquet sou being produced with a legend naming La Banque du Peuple. Designed by the Montreal engraver Joseph Arnault, the reverse includes two emblems of liberty: a star to the left and a Phrygian cap to the right. The star was a symbol popular in contemporary U.S. coinage, perhaps suggesting a willingness to join the union, and the cap, also known as a "Liberty Cap", represented freedom from British rule. A manuscript has been found in the National Archives of Canada claiming that this token was released in Saint-Charles on the first day of the Assembly of the Six Counties. As it was released in the same year as subsequent Lower Canada Rebellion, it became known as the "Rebellion Sou". It has been claimed that these symbols were introduced by an employee of the Bank who was a member of Société des Fils de la Liberté, a militant wing of the Assembly of the Six Counties, or by someone at the bank sympathetic to their cause. All of the bank's directors came under suspicion of being rebels, and warrants were later issued for their arrest.

=== Birmingham series ===
As the popularity of the bouquet sou grew in Lower Canada, further anonymous speculators started to import new tokens from Birmingham, England, from the mint that designed the original bouquet sou for the Bank of Montreal. These bouquet sou tend to have the legend "Bas Canada", though at least one issue uses the English equivalent "Lower Canada".

=== Montreal issues ===
As demand for the bouquet sou continued to grow, additional varieties were minted within Montreal. These varieties varied considerably in terms of quality, size and weight. All of the legends of these tokens are in French.

=== Replacement and redemption ===
The many unofficial and underweight versions of the bouquet sou reached a critical point, and the banks in Lower Canada stopped accepting them. To replace the bouquet sous, the Montreal banks began to issue half pennies and pennies in what became known as the Habitant token design. An ordinance issued in June 1838 declared that the only legal tender than would be accepted within Lower Canada were copper coins issued by the United Kingdom, American cents, and the new bank-issued "Habitant" tokens. As bouquet sou were returned to the banks, they were redeemed for the new coinage, and evidently the old bouquet sous found a new existence in Upper Canada where they were shipped, as the ordinance did not apply there.

== Numismatic study ==
This coin series was first described in numismatic literature by the early Canadian numismatist R.W. McLachlan in his book Canadian Numismatics, published in 1886. He called the coins the "un sou" series, and was the first to comprehensively describe their background, characteristics and to describe their manufacture, where known. He described more than 40 varieties of the tokens, arranging the chief varieties into nine different groups, arranged by the similarity of their design and who was thought to have created them. He noted key differences in the type and number of heraldic flowers used on the reverse, the differences in the legends that were used, and the shape of the ribbon used to tie the bouquet.

The name "bouquet sou" to describe these tokens came from Canadian numismatist Pierre-Napoléon Breton, who depicted many of the varieties in his book Illustrated History of Coins and Tokens Relating to Canada, originally published in 1890. In his Breton numbering system for these tokens, they run from 670-716, totaling 46 main varieties. Breton roughly followed the order of the tokens as described in McLachlan's earlier book, which ended up with many of the tokens produced later appearing earlier in his numbering system, and those that were produced first at the end. Breton's illustrations are finely detailed, and some modern publications still use them (as opposed to using photographs of the tokens) to help collectors distinguish between the many varieties. Breton sorted the bouquet sou according to the number of leaves contained within the wreath on the obverse.

Modern guides list over 50 tokens belonging to the bouquet sou series, many of which have significant variants, including die orientation, planchet thickness and being struck on different metals to name a few.

=== Overstruck examples ===
McLachlan also mentioned that he was aware of examples of the Bouquet Sou tokens that had been overstruck on top of earlier token issues, including brass examples of a Bust and Harp token and Tiffins tokens. More modern studies of the bouquet sou have discovered additional varieties that were unknown to the 19th century numismatists, including at least one issue that was struck over previously minted coins. These include a few examples struck over Blacksmith tokens, possibly in a bid to convert "uncirculatable" tokens to the more popular and acceptable bouquet sou. Numismatist R.C. Willey described a number of additional, earlier token types that had otherwise been "rendered obsolete when the banks would no longer take them except by weight". He listed additional examples of Bouquet Sous that had been overstruck on a Brock token, a Ships Colonies and Commerce token, and on a Sloop token.

== Bibliography ==
- Bell, Geoffrey (April 21, 2016). "Geoffrey Bell Auctions: Featuring the Richard Cooper Collection Part III". Geoffrey Bell Auctions.
- Breton, P. N. (1894). Illustrated History of Coins and Tokens Relating to Canada. P.N. Breton & Co.
- Cross, W. K. (2012). Canadian Colonial Tokens, 8th Edition. The Charlton Press. ISBN 978-0-88968-351-8.
- Courteau, Eugene (1908). The Canadian Bouquet-Sous. St Jacques.
- Denison, Merrill (1966). Canada's First Bank: A History of the Bank of Montreal, Volume One. McClelland and Stewart Ltd.
- Faulkner, Christopher (2017). Coins are Like Songs: The Upper Canada Coppers 1815–1841. Spink. ISBN 9-781907-427718.
- Grawey, Tim (April 17, 2018). "Colonial Tokens: What's in a name? Plenty when seeking rare Side View token". Canadian Coin News. 56 (1): 15.
- Grawey, Tim (November 1, 2016). "Colonial Tokens: Bouquet Sou overstrikes prove intriguing". Canadian Coin News. 54 (15): 8.
- Kleeberg, John M. (2009). Numismatic Finds of the Americas an Inventory of American Coin Hoards, Shipwrecks, Single Finds, and Finds in Excavations. American Numismatic Society. ISBN 978-0-89722-311-9. JSTOR 43607140.
- McLachlan, R. W. (1886). Canadian Numismatics.
- McLachlan, R. W. (1892). Coins Struck in Canada Previous 1840. J. Goemaere.
- Stanley, W. J. (Bill) (2018). 2019 Breton Tokens. Canadian Wholesale Supply.
- Willey, Robert C. (2011). The Annotated Colonial Coinages of Canada. PetchNet.
