= French sol =

Name used for different coins since antiquity

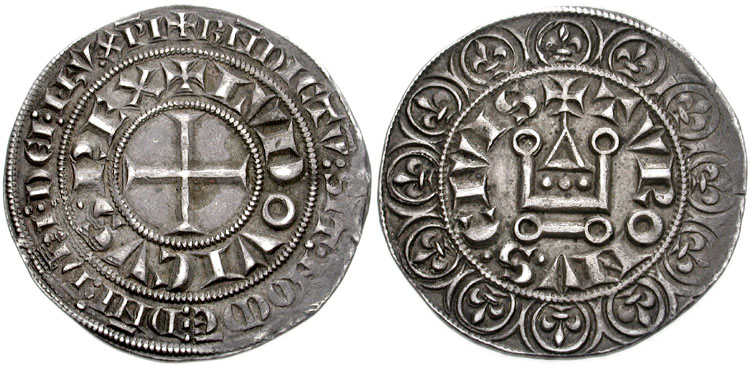
Gros from Saint Louis worth 1 sou tournois

The sol, later called a sou, is the name of a number of different coins, for accounting or payment, dating from Antiquity to today. The name is derived from the late-Roman and Byzantine solidus. Its longevity of use anchored it in many expressions of the French language.

== Roman antiquity ==
The solidus is a coin made of 4.5 g of gold, created by emperor Constantine to replace the aureus.

== Early Middle Ages ==
Doing honour to its name, the new currency earned the reputation of unalterability, crossing almost unchanged the decline and fall of the Western Roman Empire, and the great invasions and the creation of Germanic kingdoms throughout Europe. Not only was it issued in the Byzantine Empire until the 11th century under the name of nomisma, but the solidus was imitated by the barbarian kings, particularly the Merovingians, albeit most often in the form of a "third of a sou" (tremissis).

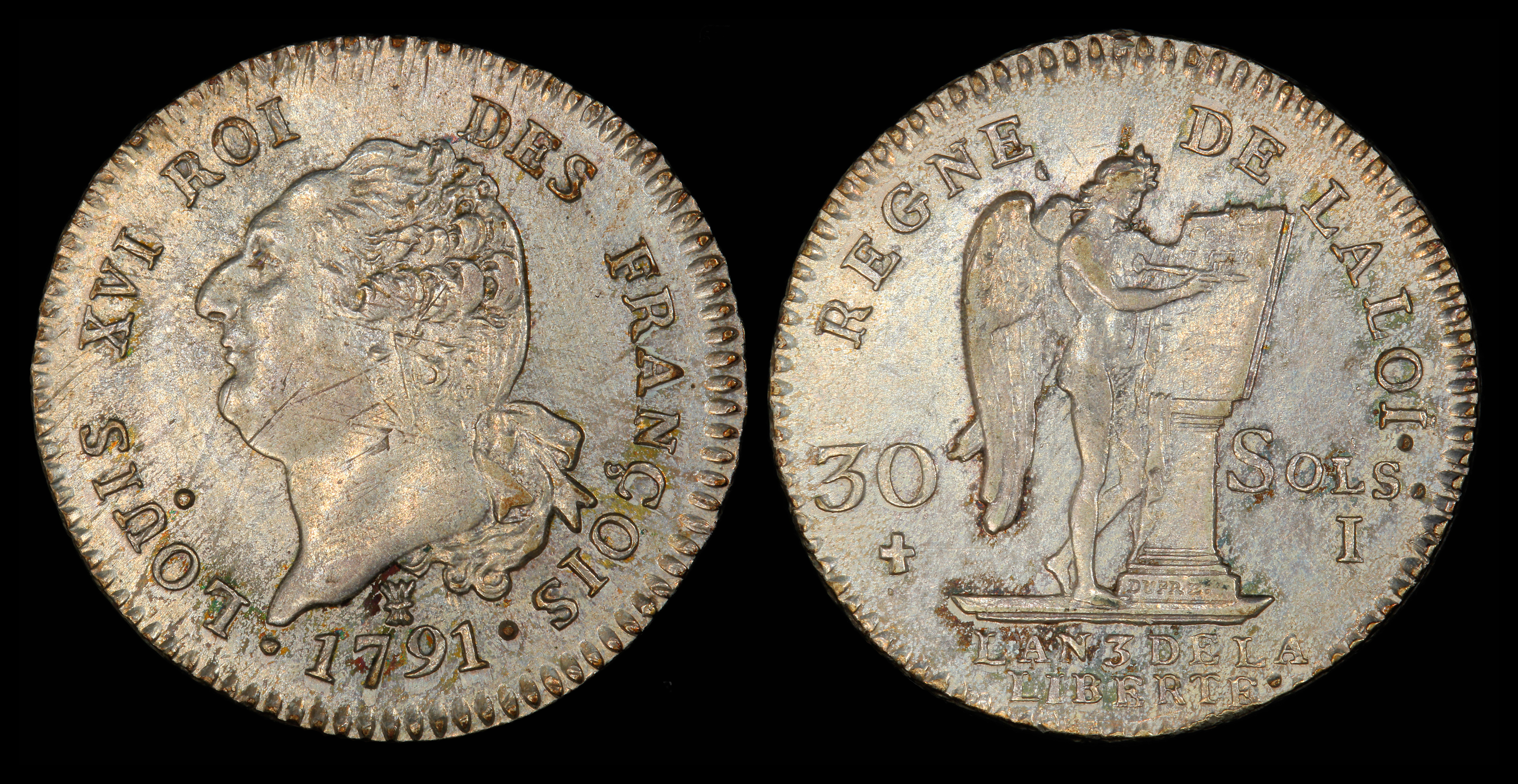
1791, 30 sols depicting Louis XVI

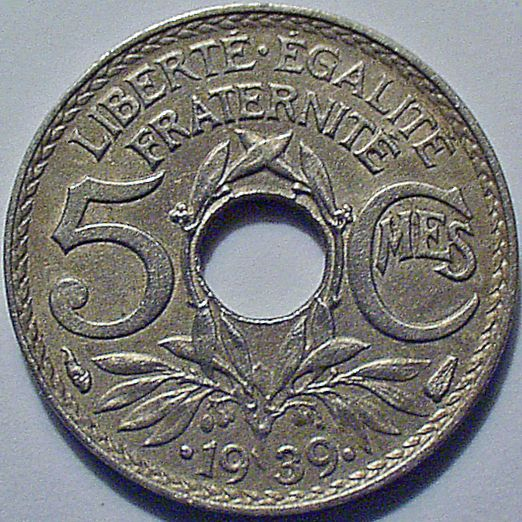
The last "sou" : 1939, French five centimes (actual ⌀: 19 mm)

Facing a shortage of gold, Charlemagne introduced a new "stabilization" (as devaluations are often called): from then on the solidus no longer represents 1/12 of the Roman gold pound but 1/20 of the Carolingian silver pound instead. The sou itself was divided into 12 denarii and one denarius was worth 10 asses. With rare exceptions (such as Saint Louis' "gros"), the denarius was for a long time in practice the only coin in circulation, with solidi and pounds used only as accounting units.

Charlemagne's general principle of 12 denarii worth one sol and of twenty sols worth one pound was eventually declined along many variants according to the alloy used and the dual metal gold:silver sometimes used for some issues. Only members of the money changers corporation could find their way among the equivalences and the many currencies used in Europe at each period, and therefore were unavoidable for most non-local commercial operations.

== Late Middle Ages ==
The name evolved, along with the rest of the language, from Latin to French. Solidus became soldus, then solt in the 11th century, then sol a century later. In the 18th century, the spelling of sol was adapted to sou so as to be closer to the pronunciation that had previously become the norm for several centuries.

== Abolition and legacy ==
In 1795, the livre was officially replaced by the franc and the sou became obsolete as an official currency division. Nevertheless, the term sou survived as a slang word for 1/20 of a franc. Thus, the large bronze five-centime coin was called the sou (for example in Balzac or Victor Hugo), while the five-franc coin was called the pièce de cent sous ("hundred sous coin") or écu (as in Zola's Germinal). The last five-centime coin, a remote souvenir inherited from the franc germinal, was removed from circulation in the 1940s, but the word sou continues in use (except for the 1960 new franc's five-centime coin, which was worth five old francs).

== Sous outside France ==
=== Britain ===
The term 'sou' is often used in the exclamation "haven't got a sou". This is to denote that one has no money, not even a single coin. This phrase is used mostly without the knowledge of the source of the word 'sou'.

=== Canada ===
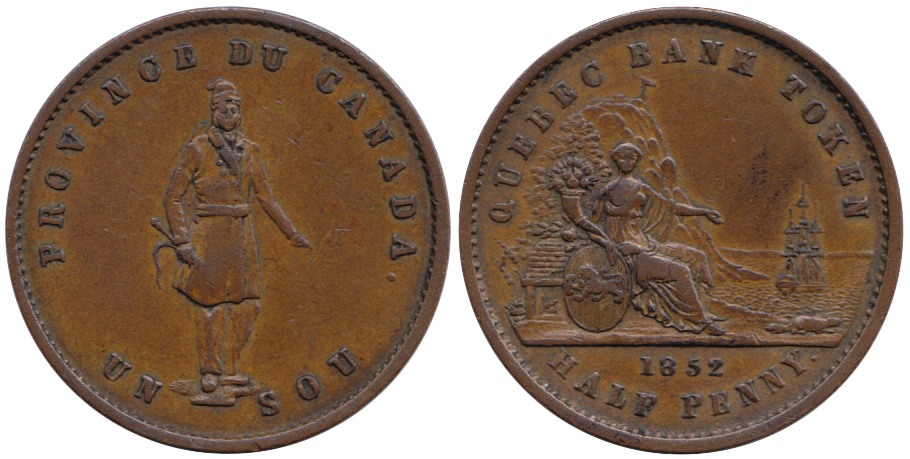
Bank token of the Province of Canada, 1852. On the obverse, the denomination "UN SOU", on the reverse, "HALF PENNY".

In Canadian French, the word "sou" is used in everyday language and means the 1/100 division of the Canadian dollar. The official term is "cent". Canadian one-cent coins (no longer in circulation) have the vernacular name of sou noir. The Canadian quarter, valued at 25 cents, is called trente sous ("thirty sous"). This usage dates from when the word sou was used in French-speaking Lower Canada to refer to the halfpenny coin of the Canadian pound; at that time an American quarter was valued at 1 shilling 3 pence Canadian (i.e. 15 pence Canadian), and the usage remained after Canada switched currencies. Échanger quatre trente sous pour une piastre ("to exchange four 30 sous for one piastre") therefore means changing something for an identical thing, as the "piastre" is the common name for the Canadian dollar.

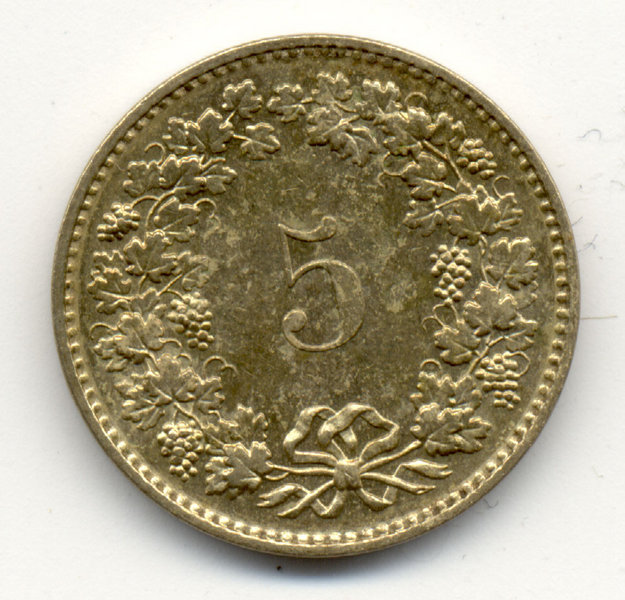
Current five Swiss centimes

=== Switzerland ===
In Switzerland, a hundred-sou coin is a five Swiss franc coin and a four sou coin is a twenty Swiss centime coin. The word sou also remains in informal language in the terms "ten, twenty ... sous".

=== Vietnam ===
The French term sou was borrowed into Vietnamese as the word xu / su (樞). The term is usually used to simply mean the word "coin" often in compound in the forms of đồng xu (銅樞) or tiền xu (錢樞). The modern Vietnamese đồng is nominally divided into 100 xu.

== The sou in French expressions ==
Used for over a thousand years, the word sou is deeply rooted in the French language and expressions. Les sous, plural, is a synonym for money.

- « Se faire des sous », to make money.
- « Une affaire de gros sous » is big money business.
- « Être sans le sou », « ne pas avoir sou vaillant », « n'a pas un sou en poche », « n'avoir ni sou ni maille »: "not having one penny", having no money at all.
- About one who is always short of money or always asking for some, one says that « Il lui manque toujours 3 sous pour faire un franc » ("he always lacks 3 sous to make up to one franc"). Sometimes it is said "missing 19 sous to have one franc", with one franc worth 20 sous; U.S. version: "he always needs a penny to have a round dollar".
- « Je te parie cent sous contre un franc » ("I bet you 100 sous (5 francs) for 1 franc"), meaning "I am sure about (whatever the topic is)".
- « Un sou est un sou », there is no small profit, equivalent to "a penny saved is a penny earned".
- « Sou par sou » or « sou à sou », little by little.
- « Être près de ses sous » ("to be near one's money"), to be avaricious/tight-fisted.
- « On lui donnerait cent sous à le voir », "one would give him 100 sous upon sight", for someone whose appearance inspires pity.
- « S'ennuyer à cent sous (de) l'heure », being very bored.
- When something is worth « trois francs six sous », it is very cheap.
- « Un objet de quatre sous » ("a two-penny item") is of even lesser value, thus the "3 Groschen Opera" from Brecht has become "l'Opéra de 4 sous".
- When one « n'a pas deux sous de jugeote », one "doesn't have an ounce of common sense".
- A « machine à sous » is a slot machine.
- « Le sou du franc » ("the penny off the pound"), a sweetener for a buyer.
- « Pas ambigu/fier/modeste/courageux/... pour un sou » is "not at all ambiguous/proud/modest/courageous/...".

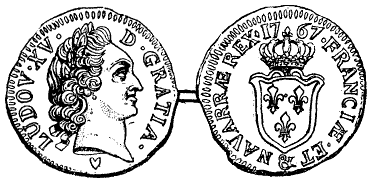
Copper sol, 1767, struck for King Louis XV

== See also ==
- Solidus (coin)
- Roman and Byzantine coinage
- Bezant
- Nomisma
- Hoxne Hoard
- Solidus and slash punctuation marks
