= Consolidated Bank of Canada =

19th-century bank

- Type: Consumer bank
- Industry: Banking
- Predecessors: City Bank; Royal Canadian Bank
- Founded: 1876; 150 years ago in Toronto, Ontario, Canada
- Defunct: 1880; 146 years ago
- Fate: Bankruptcy; liquidated in 1882
- Headquarters: Toronto, Canada
- Products: Retail banking

The Consolidated Bank of Canada was created from the merger of City Bank and Royal Canadian Bank in 1876, collapsed in 1879, and liquidation completed in 1882.
