= Habitant token =

Series of tokens used in Lower Canada from 1837

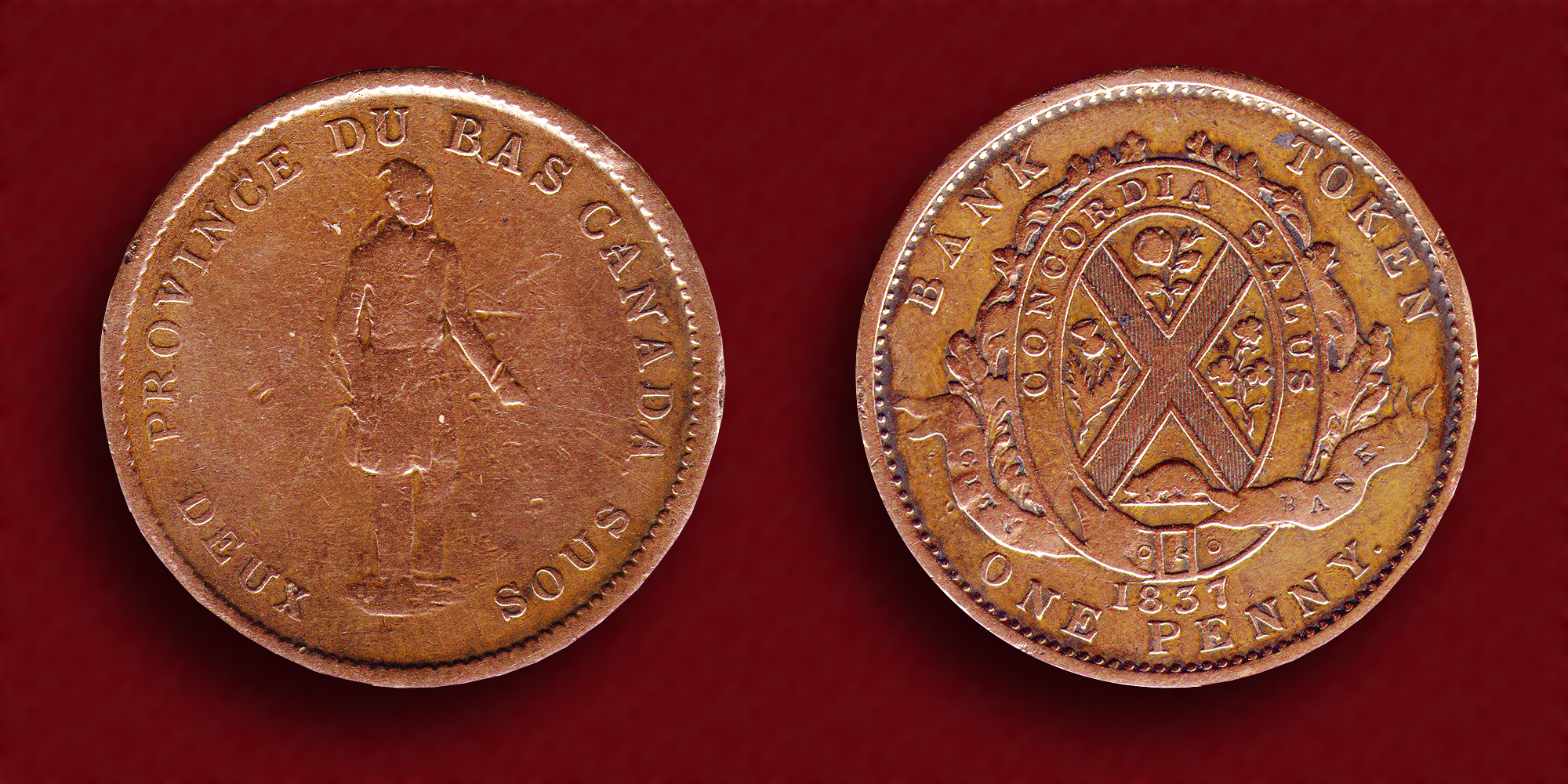
Obverse and reverse image of a typical "habitant token", depicting the figure of an habitant holding a whip, and the other side a bunch of heraldic flowers surrounded by the words "Concordia salus" (the motto of the Bank of Montreal) and "Bas-Canada".

The habitant token were a series of tokens that were created for use primarily within Lower Canada and were issued in 1837. Produced as a successor to the popular bouquet sous, these tokens depict an habitant on the obverse, a traditional depiction of a French-Canadian farmer in winter clothing, and the coat of arms for the City of Montreal on the reverse. The tokens were issued in both one penny/deux sous and half penny/un sou denominations by the leading commercial banks of Montreal. They were issued in large numbers and can be easily acquired by the modern collector, though some varieties are rare and command a premium.

These tokens replaced the popular bouquet sous that the banks of Lower Canada had previously introduced into circulation. The habitant tokens were known to still be in use over 60 years after they were originally issued, and are known from archaeological evidence to have circulated in Upper Canada as well. These tokens are classified as "semi-regal" by Canadian numismatists, as they were authorized by the colonial government.

== History ==
In 1837 the Bank of Montreal applied for permission from Britain to import copper tokens to a value of £5,000. Permission was granted, but only on the condition that the other major commercial banks of Montreal also participated. The other banks agreed, and an order was placed with the minting firm Boulton and Watt, in Birmingham, to produce the tokens, each containing the name of the issuing bank on a ribbon contained on the reverse of the token. The Bank of Montreal paid £2,000 for the production of these tokens, and the other three Montreal banks—City Bank of Montreal, The Quebec Bank and La Banque du Peuple— £1,000 apiece. The £5,000 (paid in Sterling), was for the cost of production of the tokens, which amounted to roughly £7,700 of half pennies and pennies being produced against the Halifax rating, the money standard used in Lower Canada at the time. From these figures it has been estimated that roughly 1.8 million half pennies and just over 900,000 pennies were minted. The tokens arrived in Lower Canada in four separate shipments, beginning in late May 1838 and ending in late 1839. While the tokens were originally intended to be struck at five-sixths of the weight of British copper coins, they were struck at full weight instead, making them more substantial than the bouquet sous they were designed to replace, and closer to their actual value in copper.

Another common name for this series of tokens was the "Papineau", named after Louis-Joseph Papineau. He was the leader of the reformist Patriote movement before the Lower Canada Rebellion of 1837–1838 and was well known for wearing habitant clothing almost as uniform. While including an image of an habitant as an emblem of Lower Canada was intended, it is highly unlikely that the established banks of Montreal (and particularly the politically conservative Bank of Montreal) meant their token to be identified with Papineau, with one numismatist remarking that "the connection between them and the great statesman is purely sentimental".

These tokens circulated long after they were originally issued, and were alluded to in an order in council from the minister of finance in August 1870:

"while bronze cents and the Copper coins of the United Kingdom alone are legal tender, the principal Copper Currency consists of Bank tokens of the Bank of Montreal, Bank of Upper Canada, Quebec Bank & Banque du Peuple, all of which are of good quality, and all authorized by law. That these coins are only current at the rates of a half penny & a penny old Currency, while postage & other stamps are in cents. That it is essentially necessary to establish a uniform Copper Currency, and after much consideration he is of opinion that if the Government would instruct its Departments to receive the Bank tokens at one and two Cents respectively, the public would do so likewise, and by this means a great deal of the inconvenience would be removed."

The following year (1871) the Uniform Currency Act received royal assent, which set the denominations for Canadian currency officially against a decimal-based dollar.

=== Later production of muled varieties ===
In 1850, London engraver W.J. Taylor purchased a number of coining tools and dies from the Soho Mint, where the original habitant tokens (along with many subsequent Lower Canadian issues) had been created. He started to create a number of restrikes of coins using the original dies. All of the varieties he produced were mules, containing the reverse from one coin design matched with the obverse of another. He is known to have created mules using the reverse of the 1837 habitant token and the obverse of the later "front view" Bank of Montreal penny from 1842 in copper, brass, and silver.

== Design ==
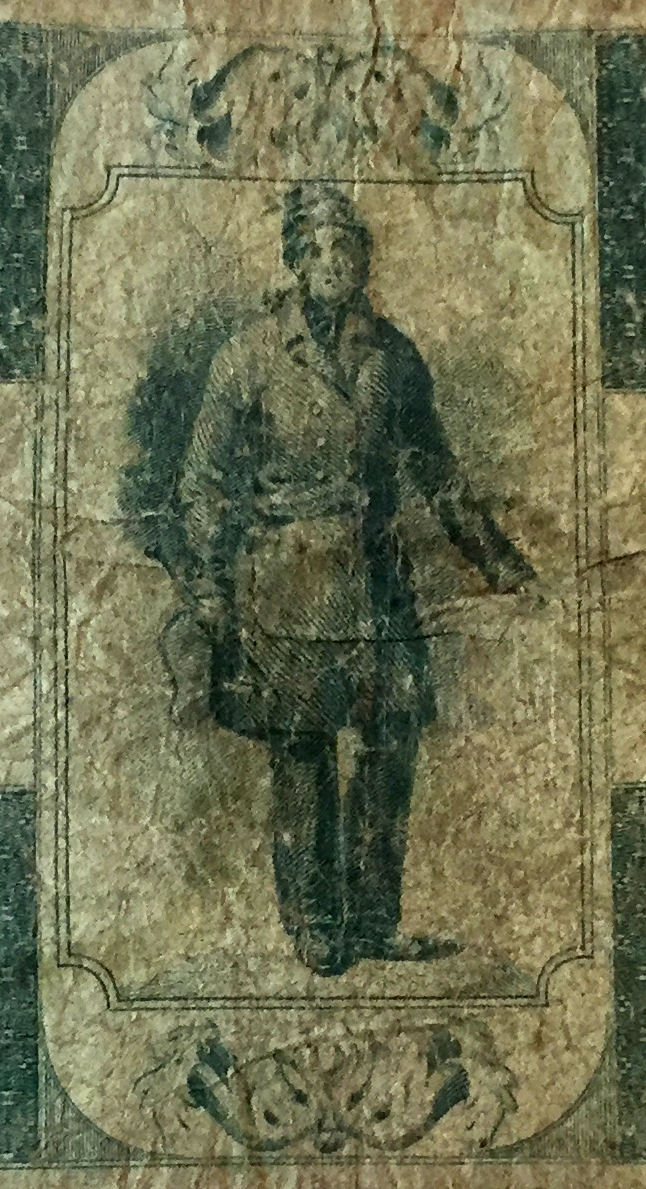
Detail of an image of an habitant on the back of a Banque Canadienne one-dollar bill from the early 19th century.

The design for the habitant on the obverse of the coin was designed by James Duncan, and was originally used on the back of a Banque Canadienne one-dollar bill, the design engraved by Rawden, Wright and Hatch of New York. The image depicts the habitant wearing traditional winter clothing, including a touque, a hooded frock coat, moccasins, and a "ceinture fléchée" sash. He also holds a whip in his right hand. Above him is the legend "Province du Bas Canada" and the value, either "un sou" or "deux sous", below.

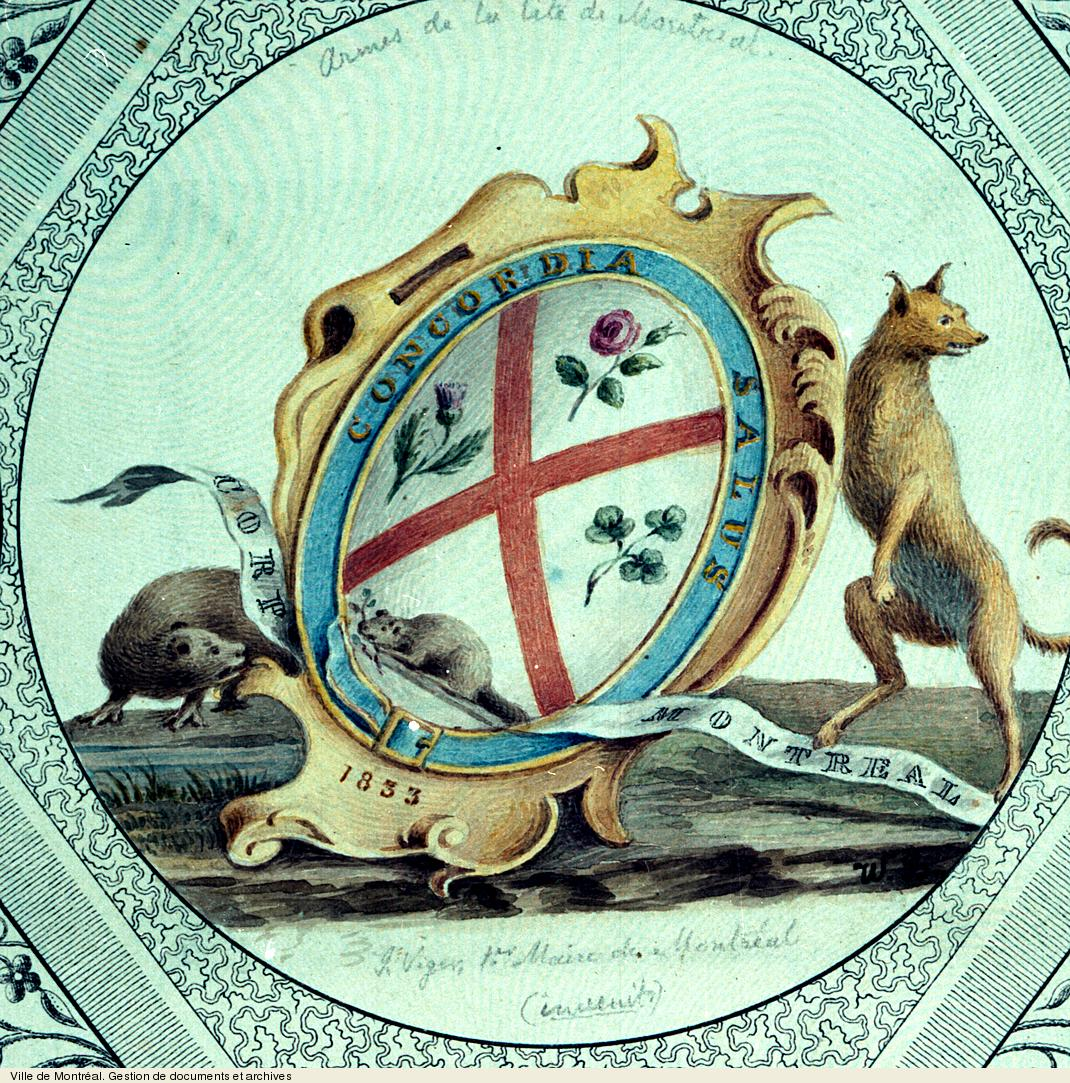
First coat of arms (1833) for the City of Montreal

The reverse features the original design of the coat of arms of Montreal, as designed by Mayor Jacques Viger and the city council in 1833. A large Saint Andrew's Cross divides the shield into four segments, and in each of these spaces a heraldic symbol representing different settler populations: at top, a rose for the English heritage of the population, a thistle for the Scots, a sprig of clover to represent the Irish, and at bottom a beaver for the French that originally settled the territory and traded in furs. The motto surrounding the shield says "concordia salus", a Latin phrase meaning "salvation through harmony", which is the motto of the city of Montreal and of the Bank of Montreal as well. A ribbon bearing the name of the issuing bank appears on a ribbon that flows across the base of the coat of arms. The words "bank token" appears at the top, "half penny" or "one penny" at the bottom, along with the issue date of 1837.

== Numismatic study ==
Early Canadian numismatist Pierre-Napoléon Breton illustrates both the half penny and penny varieties of these tokens in his book Illustrated History of Coins and Tokens Relating to Canada, originally published in 1890. Despite the fact that there were four varieties of each type of token based on the bank they were issued from, Breton gave the number 521 to all of the pennies, and 522 to all of the half pennies. At least one later catalog appends letters to Breton's numbering (i.e. 521, 521a, 521b, and 521c) to represent tokens from each of the banks.

The first detailed study of the series and its variants was The Habitant Tokens of Lower Canada (Province of Quebec) written by Canadian numismatist Eugene Courteau, published in 1927. He grouped varieties of the half penny according to whether the right serif of the letter V in province was at the same level as that of the following letter I, or whether it was lower. For the pennies Courteau grouped them two groups, based on whether the patch of ground the habitant stands on is large or small. A sub-group of these included a period that sometimes appeared after the word Canada. He described over 60 distinct varieties of the habitant half penny, and over 50 varieties of the pennies. More modern catalogs tend to be more conservative in assigning distinct varieties than Courteau, with one listing only 9 major varieties of the half pennies, and 13 for the pennies.

== Bibliography ==
- Banning, E. B. (1988). Exploring Canadian Colonial Tokens. Charlton International Inc. ISBN 0-88968-074-4.
- Bell, Geoffrey (1 October 2015). "Geoffrey Bell Auctions: Presents the Richard Cooper Collection". Geoffrey Bell Auctions.
- Breton, P. N. (1894). Illustrated History of Coins and Tokens Relating to Canada. P.N. Breton & Co.
- Cross, W. K. (2012). Canadian Colonial Tokens, 8th Edition. The Charlton Press. ISBN 978-0-88968-351-8.
- Courteau, Eugene (1927). The Habitant Tokens of Lower Canada (Province of Quebec). St Jacques.
- Faulkner, Christopher (2017). Coins are Like Songs: The Upper Canada Coppers 1815–1841. Spink. ISBN 9-781907-427718.
- Tim, Grawey (19 February 2019). "BMO 'Habitant' halfpenny spawns unique varieties". Canadian Coin News. 56 (23): 12.
- Heritage World and Ancient Coins: The Doug Robins Collection of Canadian Tokens. Chicago: Heritage Numismatic Auctions, Inc. 20 April 2018.
- Kleeberg, John M. (2009). Numismatic Finds of the Americas an Inventory of American Coin Hoards, Shipwrecks, Single Finds, and Finds in Excavations. American Numismatic Society. pp. 1–358. ISBN 978-0-89722-311-9. JSTOR 43607140.
- Stanley, W. J. (Bill) (2018). 2019 Breton Tokens. Canadian Wholesale Supply.
- Willey, Robert C. (2011). The Annotated Colonial Coinages of Canada. PetchNet.
