= New Brunswick dollar =

Currency of New Brunswick from 1860 to 1867

New Brunswick dollar (Canadian English)

Unit
- Symbol: $

Denominations
- Subunit
- 1/100: cent
- Banknotes: 1, 2, 3, 4, 5, 8, 10, 20, 50, 100 dollars
- Coins: 1/2, 1, 5, 10, 20 cents

Demographics
- Date of introduction: 1860
- Replaced: New Brunswick pound
- Date of withdrawal: 1867
- Replaced by: Canadian dollar
- User(s): New Brunswick

Valuation
- Value: NB$1 = CA$1
- This infobox shows the latest status before this currency was rendered obsolete.

The dollar was the currency of New Brunswick between 1860 and 1867. It replaced the pound at a rate of 4 dollars = 1 pound (5 shillings = 1 dollar) and was equal to the Canadian dollar. New Brunswick currency was created by New Brunswick based banks until the advent of central banking following the 1933 The Royal Commission on Banking and Currency (also known as the Macmillan Commission).

== Coins ==
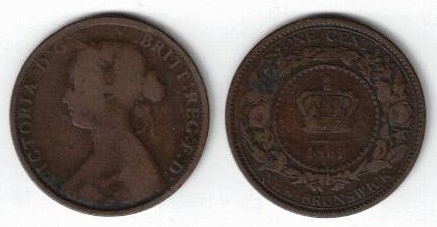
New Brunswick one cent coin

Coins were issued between 1861 and 1864 in denominations of 1/2, 1, 5, 10 and 20 cent. The 1/2 and 1 cent were struck in bronze, the others in silver. The 1/2 cent piece was struck in error by the Royal Mint, as New Brunswick used a different pound conversion rate than Nova Scotia and did not require the denomination. As most of the coins were returned for melting, surviving 1/2 cent pieces are scarce.

== Banknotes ==
Four chartered banks issued notes, the Bank of New Brunswick, the Central Bank of New Brunswick, the Commercial Bank of New Brunswick and the People's Bank of New Brunswick. Denominations issued were 1, 2, 3, 4, 5, 8, 10, 20, 50 and 100 dollars. The Commercial Bank's notes also bore the denominations in pounds and shillings. The Bank of New Brunswick and the People's Bank of New Brunswick continued to issue notes after Confederation, see Canadian chartered bank notes.

== See also ==
- New Brunswick pound
