= Canadian dollar =

Currency of Canada

Dollar canadien (French) Can$, C$, CA$, CDN$, CAD
- 2011 Frontier series (polymer notes)

ISO 4217
- Code: CAD (numeric: 124)
- Subunit: 0.01

Units of account
- Base unit: dollar
- Plural: dollars
- Symbol: $
- Nickname: Loonie, buck (in English); Huard, piastre (pronounced piasse in popular usage) (in French)
- Subunit
- 1/100: cent
- Plural
- cent: cents
- Symbol
- cent: ¢
- Nickname
- cent: In French: sou, plural is sous.

Denominations
- Banknotes: $5, $10, $20, $50, $100
- Coins
- Freq. used: 5¢, 10¢, 25¢, $1, $2
- Rarely used: 1¢, 50¢

Demographics
- Date of introduction: 1858
- Replaced: Canadian pound; New Brunswick dollar; Nova Scotian dollar; British Columbia dollar; Prince Edward Island dollar; Newfoundland dollar
- Official user(s): Canada
- Unofficial user: Saint Pierre and Miquelon (France)

Issuance
- Central bank: Bank of Canada
- Website: www.bankofcanada.ca
- Printer: Canadian Bank Note Company
- Website: www.cbnco.com
- Mint: Royal Canadian Mint
- Website: www.mint.ca

Valuation
- Inflation: 3.1%
- Source: Statistics Canada, October 2026
- Method: Consumer price index

The Canadian dollar (symbol: $; code: CAD; French: dollar canadien) is the official currency of Canada. There is no standard disambiguating form, but the abbreviations Can$, CA$ and C$ (Note: The abbreviation "C$" remains associated with the Nicaraguan córdoba.) are frequently used for distinction from other currencies, particularly the US dollar. (Note: There are various common abbreviations to distinguish the Canadian dollar from others: while the ISO 4217 currency code "CAD" (a three-character code without monetary symbols) is common, no single system is universally accepted. The World Bank, Editing Canadian English and The Canadian Style guide all indicate "Can$". "C$" is the symbol for the Nicaraguan córdoba, and as such is discouraged by The Canadian Style guide. Editing Canadian English also indicates "CDN$"; both style guides note the ISO code.)

The base unit is the dollar; each is divided into 100 cents (symbol: ¢). Owing to the image of a common loon on its reverse, the country's dollar coin, and sometimes the dollar itself, may be referred to as the loonie by English-speaking Canadians and foreign exchange traders and analysts. Likewise, amongst French-speaking Canadians, the French word for loon, huard, is also commonly used.

Accounting for approximately two per cent of all global reserves, as of January 2024 the Canadian dollar is the fifth-most held reserve currency in the world, behind the US dollar, euro, yen, and sterling. The Canadian dollar is popular with central banks because of Canada's relative economic soundness, the Canadian government's strong sovereign position, and the stability of the country's legal and political systems.

== History ==
=== Colonial currencies ===
The 1850s in Canada were a decade of debate over whether to adopt a £sd-based monetary system or a decimal monetary system based on the US dollar. The British North American provinces, for reasons of practicality in relation to the increasing trade with the neighbouring United States, had a desire to assimilate their currencies with the American unit, but the imperial authorities in London still preferred sterling as the sole currency throughout the British Empire. The British North American provinces nonetheless gradually adopted currencies tied to the American dollar.

Currencies used in Canada and its predecessors
Currency	Dates in use	Value in (pre-decimal) sterling	Value in Canadian dollars
Canadian pound	1841–1858	16s 5.3d	$4
Canadian dollar	1858–present	4s 1.3d	$1
New Brunswick dollar	1860–1867	4s 1.3d	$1
British Columbia dollar	1865–1871	4s 1.3d	$1
Prince Edward Island dollar	1871–1873	4s 1.3d	$1
Nova Scotian dollar	1860–1871	4s	$0.973
Newfoundland dollar	1865–1895	4s 2d	$1.014
Newfoundland dollar	1895–1949	4s 1.3d	$1

==== Province of Canada ====
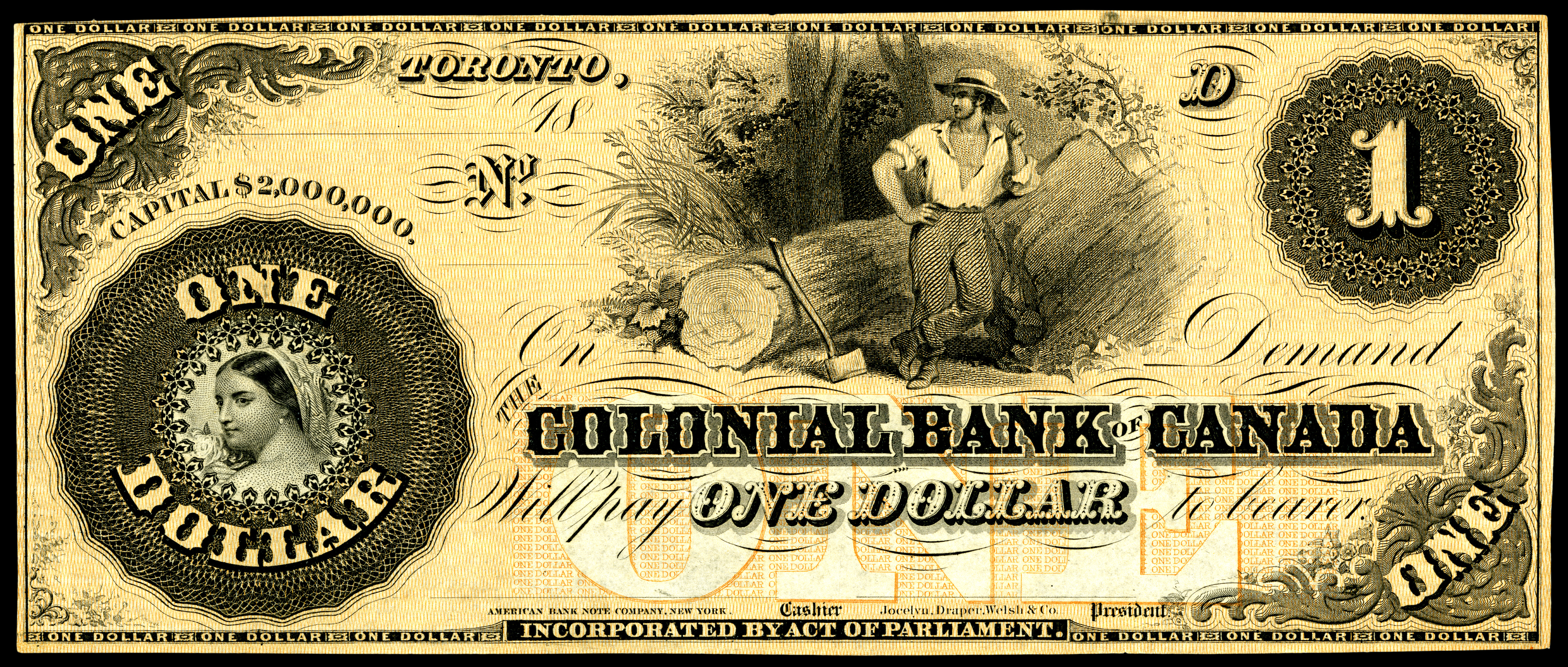
A Province of Canada one-dollar note issued by the Colonial Bank of Canada, 1859

In 1841, the Province of Canada adopted a new system based on the Halifax rating. The new Canadian pound was equal to four US dollars (92.88 grains gold), making £1 sterling equal to £1.4s.4d. Canadian. Thus, the new Canadian pound was worth 16 shillings and 5.3 pence sterling.

In 1851, the Parliament of the Province of Canada passed an act for the purposes of introducing a sterling-based unit, with decimal fractional coinage. The idea was that the decimal coins would correspond to exact amounts in relation to the US dollar fractional coinage.

In response to British concerns, in 1853, an act of the Parliament of the Province of Canada introduced the gold standard into the colony, based on both the British gold sovereign and the American gold eagle coins. This gold standard was introduced with the gold sovereign being legal tender at £1 = US$4.86 2/3. No coinage was provided for under the 1853 act. Sterling coinage was made legal tender and all other silver coins were demonetized. The British government in principle allowed for a decimal coinage but held out hope that a sterling unit would be chosen under the name of "royal". However, in 1857, the decision was made to introduce a decimal coinage into the Province of Canada in conjunction with the US dollar unit. Hence, when the new decimal coins were introduced in 1858, the colony's currency became aligned with the US currency, although the British gold sovereign continued to remain legal tender at the rate of £1 = Can$4.86 2/3 right up until the 1990s. In 1859, Canadian colonial postage stamps were issued with decimal denominations for the first time. In 1861, Canadian postage stamps were issued with the denominations shown in cents.

==== Maritime colonies ====
In 1860, the colonies of New Brunswick and Nova Scotia followed the Province of Canada in adopting a decimal system based on the US dollar unit.

In 1871, Prince Edward Island went decimal within the US dollar unit and introduced coins in the denomination of 1 cent. However, the currency of Prince Edward Island was absorbed into the Canadian system shortly afterwards, when Prince Edward Island joined the Dominion of Canada in 1873.

==== Newfoundland ====
Newfoundland went decimal in 1865, but unlike the Province of Canada, New Brunswick, and Nova Scotia, it decided to adopt a unit based on the Spanish dollar rather than on the US dollar, and there was a slight difference between these two units. The US dollar was created in 1792 on the basis of the average weight of a selection of worn Spanish dollars. As such, the Spanish dollar was worth slightly more than the US dollar, and likewise, the Newfoundland dollar, until 1895, was worth slightly more than the Canadian dollar.

==== British Columbia ====
The Colony of British Columbia adopted the British Columbia dollar as its currency in 1865, at par with the Canadian dollar. When British Columbia joined Canada as its sixth province in 1871, the Canadian dollar replaced the British Columbia dollar.

=== Post-Confederation history ===
In 1867, the Province of Canada, New Brunswick, and Nova Scotia united into a federation named Canada. As a result, their respective currencies were merged into a singular Canadian dollar. The federal Parliament passed the Uniform Currency Act in April 1871, tying up loose ends as to the currencies of the various provinces and replacing them with a common Canadian dollar.

The gold standard was temporarily abandoned during World War I and definitively abolished on April 10, 1933. At the outbreak of World War II, the exchange rate to the US dollar was fixed at Can$1.10 = US$1.00. This was changed to parity in 1946. In 1949, the British pound was devalued, and Canada followed suit, returning to a peg of Can$1.10 = US$1.00. However, Canada allowed its dollar to float in 1950, whereupon the currency rose to a slight premium over the US dollar for the next decade. But the Canadian dollar fell sharply after 1960 before it was again pegged in 1962 at Can$1.00 = US$0.925. This was sometimes pejoratively referred to as the "Diefenbuck" or the "Diefendollar", after the then Prime Minister, John Diefenbaker. This peg lasted until 1970, with the currency's value being floated since then.

== Terminology ==
The one- and two-dollar coins, nicknamed the loonie and toonie

Canadian English, similar to American English, used the slang term "buck" for a former paper dollar. The Canadian origin of this term derives from a coin struck by the Hudson's Bay Company during the 17th century with a value equal to the pelt of a male beaver – a "buck". Because of the appearance of the common loon on the back of the $1 coin that replaced the dollar bill in 1987, the word loonie was adopted in Canadian parlance to distinguish the Canadian dollar coin from the dollar bill. When the two-dollar coin was introduced in 1996, the derivative word toonie ("two loonies") became the common word for it in Canadian English slang.

In French, the currency is also called le dollar; Canadian French slang terms include piastre or piasse (the original word used in 18th-century French to translate "dollar") and huard (equivalent to loonie, since huard is French for "loon," the bird appearing on the coin). The French pronunciation of cent (pronounced similarly to English as [sɛnt] or [sɛn], not like the word for hundred, [sɑ̃]) is generally used for the subdivision; sou is another, informal, term for 1¢. 25¢ coins in Canadian French are often called trente sous ("thirty cents") because of a series of changes in terminology, currencies, and exchange rates. After the British conquest of Canada in 1760, French coins gradually went out of use, and sou became a nickname for the halfpenny, which was similar in value to the French sou. Spanish dollars and US dollars were also in use, and from 1841 to 1858, the exchange rate was fixed at $4 = £1 (or 400¢ = 240d). This made 25¢ equal to 15d, or 30 halfpence (trente sous). After decimalization and the withdrawal of halfpenny coins, the nickname sou began to be used for the 1¢ coin, but the idiom trente sous for a 25¢ coin endured.

== Coins ==
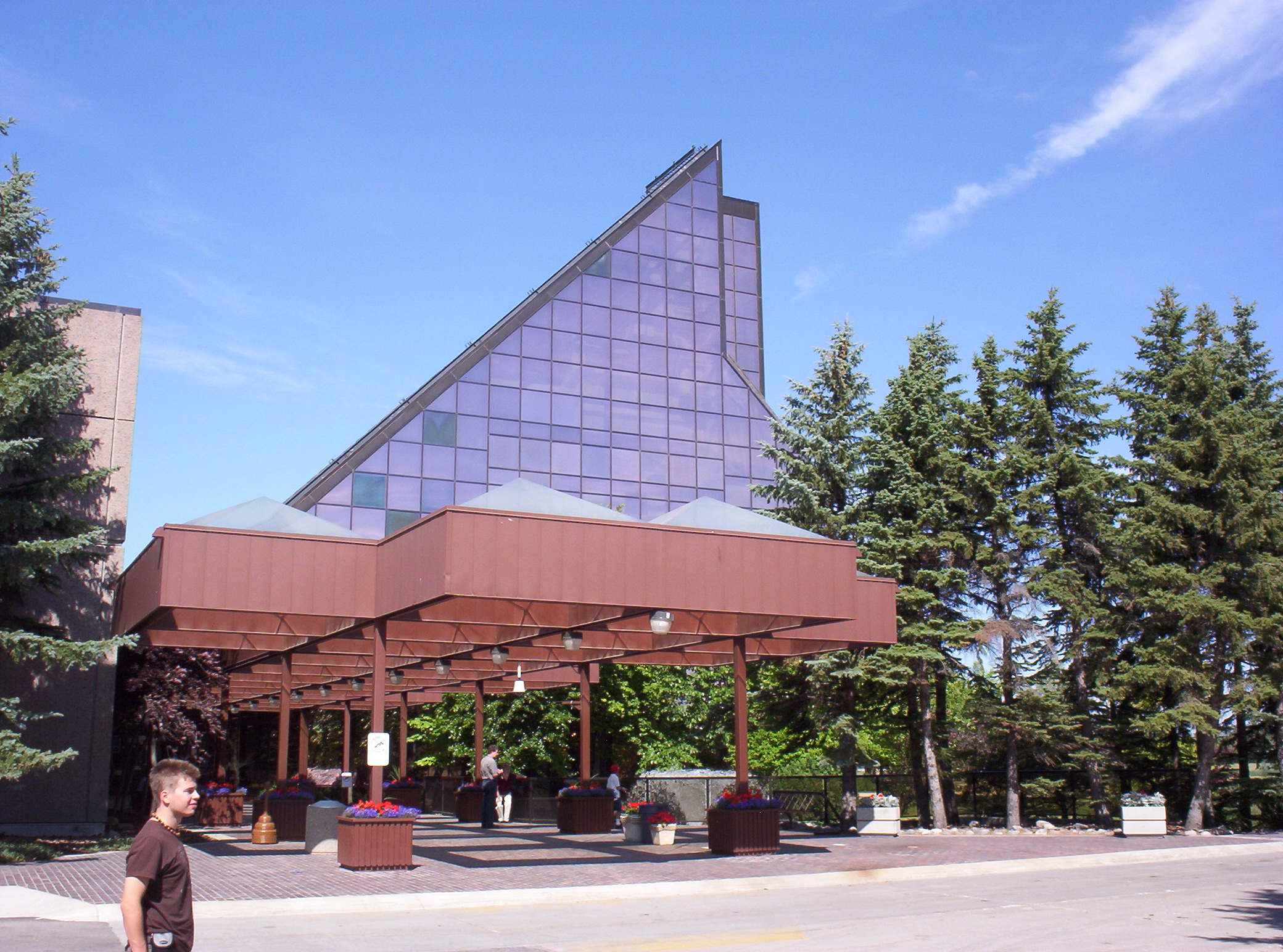
The Royal Canadian Mint production facility in Winnipeg

Coins are produced by the Royal Canadian Mint's facilities in Winnipeg, Manitoba, and Ottawa, Ontario, in denominations of 5¢ (nickel), 10¢ (dime), 25¢ (quarter), $1 (loonie), and $2 (toonie). A 50¢ coin is also struck but is no longer distributed to banks and is only available directly from the mint, therefore seeing very little circulation.

The last 1¢ coin (penny) to be minted in Canada was struck on May 4, 2012, and distribution of the penny ceased on February 4, 2013. Ever since, the price for a cash transaction is rounded to the nearest five cents. The penny continues to be legal tender, although it is only accepted as payment and is not given back as change.

The standard set of designs has Canadian symbols, usually wildlife, on the reverse, and an effigy of Charles III on the obverse. A large number of pennies, nickels, and dimes are in circulation bearing the effigy of Elizabeth II, and occasionally some depicting George VI can be found. It is also common for American coins to be found among circulation due to the close proximity to the United States and the fact that the sizes and colours of the coins are similar. Commemorative coins with differing reverses are also issued on an irregular basis, most often quarters. 50¢ coins are rarely found in circulation; they are often collected and not regularly used in day-to-day transactions in most provinces.

=== Coin history ===
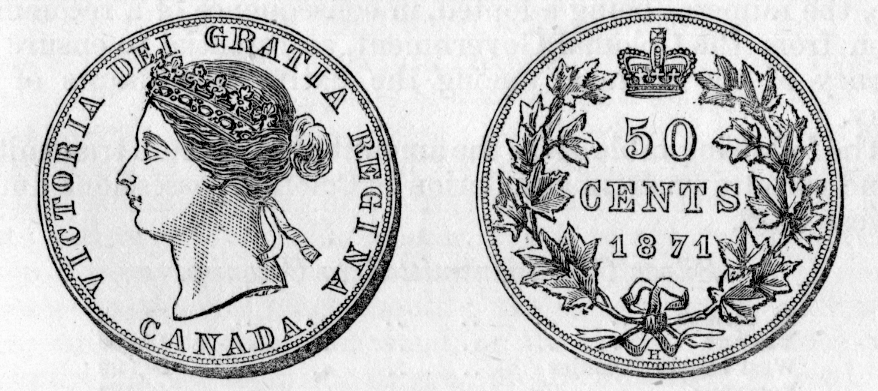
Engraving of a Canadian fifty-cent coin, issued in 1871

In 1858, bronze 1¢ and 0.925 silver 5¢, 10¢ and 20¢ coins were issued by the Province of Canada. Except for 1¢ coins struck in 1859, no more coins were issued until 1870, when production of the 5¢ and 10¢ was resumed and silver 25¢ and 50¢ were introduced. Between 1908 and 1919, sovereigns (legal tender in Canada for $4.86 2/3) were struck in Ottawa with a "C" mintmark.

Canada produced its first gold dollar coins in 1912 in the form of $5 and $10. These coins were produced from 1912 to 1914. The obverse carries an image of King George V and on the reverse is a shield with the arms of the Dominion of Canada. Gold from the Klondike River valley in the Yukon accounts for much of the gold in the coins.

Two years into the coin's production World War I began and production of the coins stopped in favour of tighter control over Canadian gold reserves. Most of the 1914 coins produced never reached circulation at the time and some were stored for more than 75 years until being sold off in 2012. The high quality specimens were sold to the public and the visually unappealing ones were melted.

In 1920, the size of the 1¢ was reduced and the silver fineness of the 5¢, 10¢, 25¢ and 50¢ coins was reduced to 0.800 silver/.200 copper. This composition was maintained for the 10¢, 25¢ and 50¢ coin through 1966, but the debasement of the 5¢ coin continued in 1922 with the silver 5¢ being entirely replaced by a larger nickel coin. In 1942, as a wartime measure, nickel was replaced by tombac in the 5¢ coin, which was changed in shape from round to dodecagonal. Chromium-plated steel was used for the 5¢ in 1944 and 1945 and between 1951 and 1954, after which nickel was readopted. The 5¢ returned to a round shape in 1963.

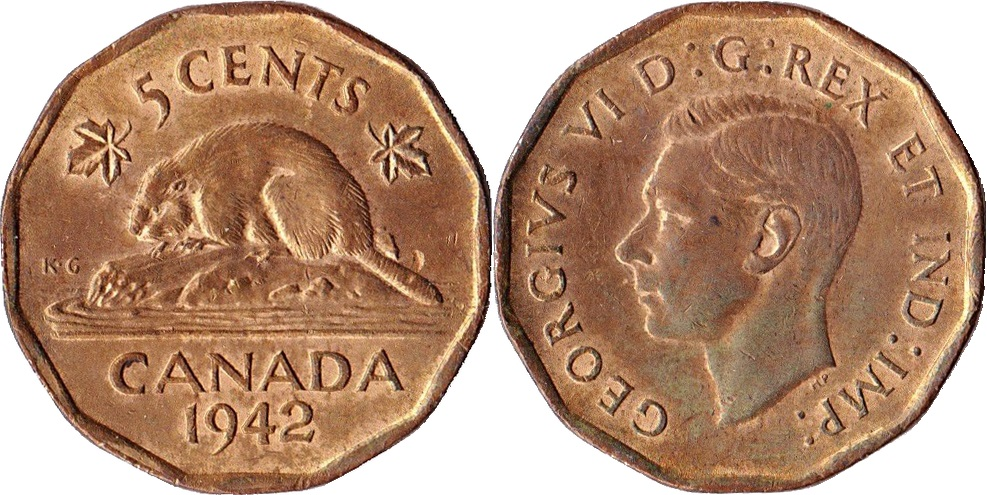
Five-cent coin, issued 1942

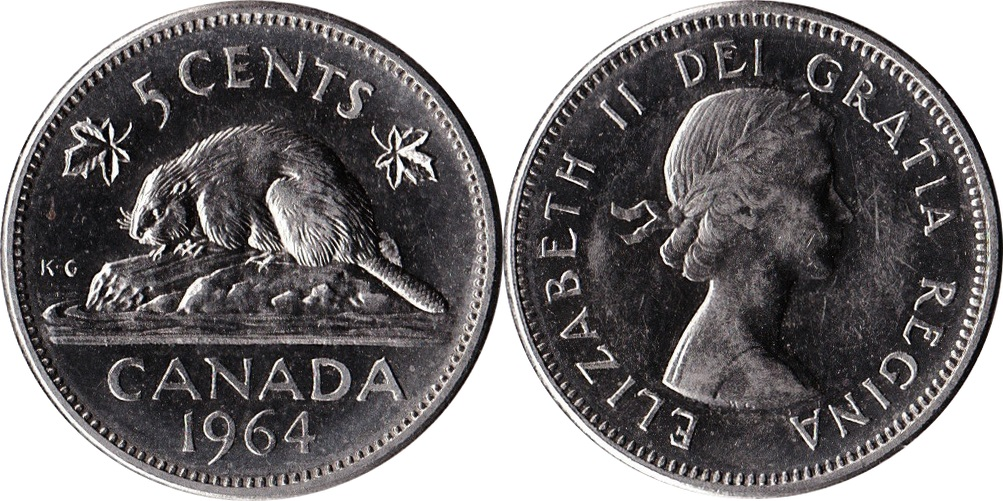
Five-cent coin, issued 1964

Several Canadian coins, like the five-cent coin, underwent changes in composition and shape in the 20th century.

In 1935, the 0.800 silver voyageur dollar was introduced. Production was maintained through 1967 with the exception of the war years between 1939 and 1945.

In 1967 both 0.800 silver/0.200 copper and, later that year, 0.500 silver/.500 copper 10¢ and 25¢ coins were issued. 1968 saw further debasement: the 0.500 fine silver dimes and quarters were completely replaced by nickel ones mid-year. All 1968 50¢ and $1 coins were reduced in size and coined only in pure nickel. Thus, 1968 marked the last year in which any circulating silver coinage was issued in Canada.

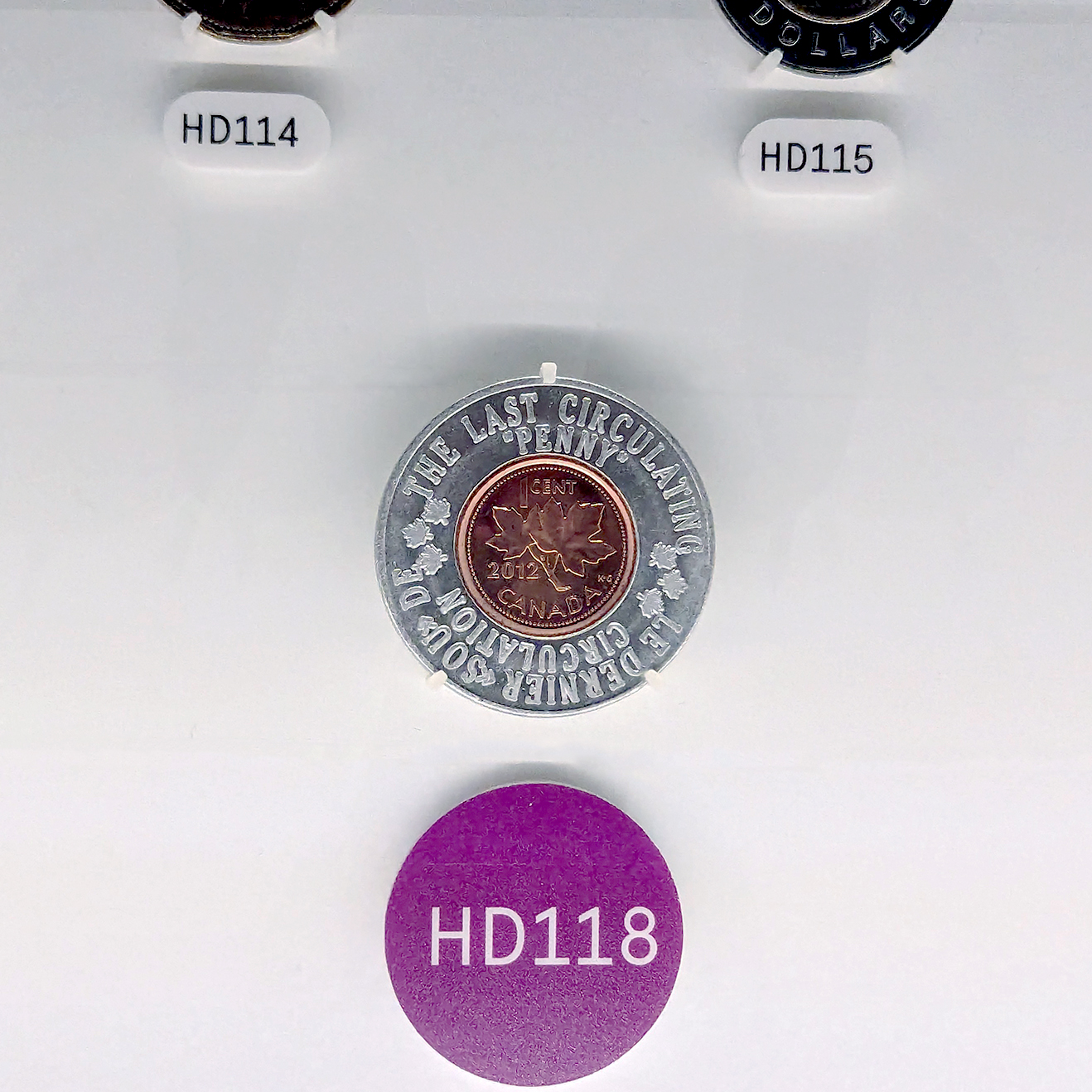
The last minted penny intended for circulation, produced at the Royal Canadian Mint in Winnipeg in 2012, on display at the Bank of Canada Museum in Ottawa

In 1982, the 1¢ coin was changed to dodecagonal, and the 5¢ was further debased to a cupro-nickel alloy. In 1987 a $1 coin struck in aureate-plated nickel was introduced. A bimetallic $2 coin followed in 1996. In 1997, copper-plated zinc replaced bronze in the 1¢, and it returned to a round shape. This was followed, in 2000, by the introduction of even cheaper plated-steel 1¢, 5¢, 10¢, 25¢ and 50¢ coins, with the 1¢ plated in copper and the others plated in cupro-nickel. In 2012, the multi-ply plated-steel technology was introduced for $1 and $2 coins as well. Also in that year mintage of the 1¢ coin ceased and its withdrawal from circulation began in 2013.

== Banknotes ==
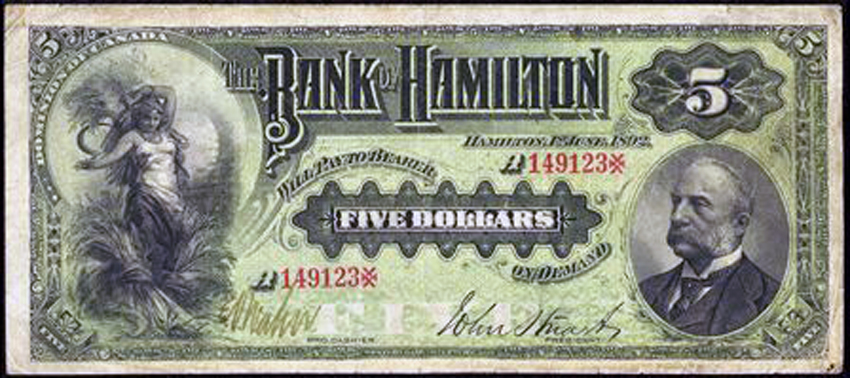
An 1892 five-dollar note issued by the Bank of Hamilton. Early Canadian dollar notes were issued by Canadian charter banks.

The first paper money issued in Canada denominated in dollars were British Army bills, issued between 1813 and 1815. Canadian dollar banknotes were later issued by the chartered banks starting in the 1830s, by several pre-Confederation colonial governments (most notably the Province of Canada in 1866), and after confederation, by the Canadian government starting in 1870. Some municipalities also issued notes, most notably depression scrip during the 1930s.

On July 3, 1934, with only 10 chartered banks still issuing notes, the Bank of Canada was founded. This new government agency became the sole issuer of all federal notes. In 1935, it issued its first series of notes in denominations of $1, $2, $5, $10, $20, $25, $50, $100, $500 and $1000. The $25 note was a commemorative issue, released to mark the Silver Jubilee of King George V. In 1944, the chartered banks were prohibited from issuing their own currency, with the Royal Bank of Canada and the Bank of Montreal among the last to issue notes.

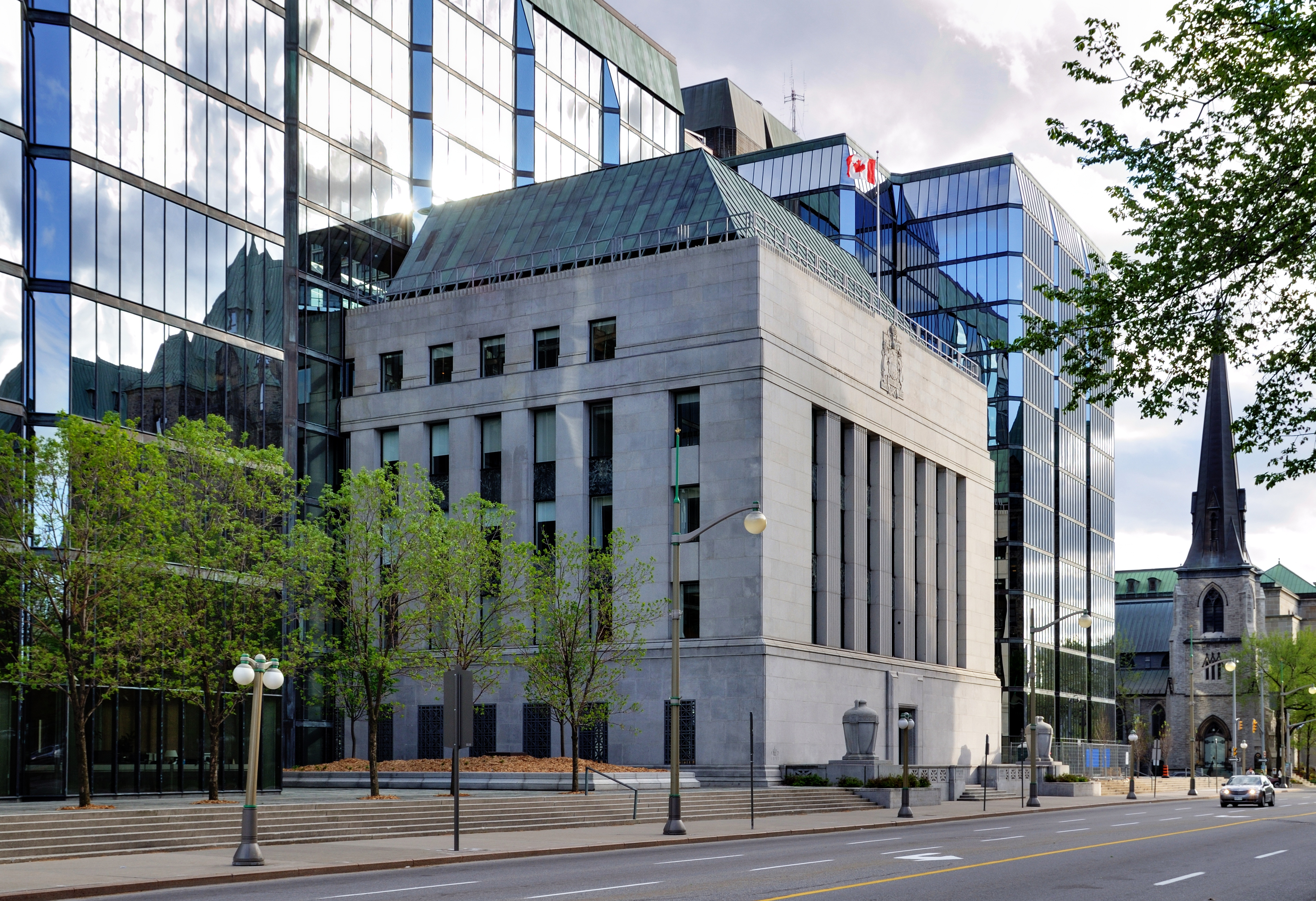
The Bank of Canada headquarters. The Bank of Canada is the sole issuer of federal notes.

Significant design changes to the notes have occurred since 1935, with new series introduced in 1937, 1954, 1970, 1986, and 2001. In June 2011, newly designed notes printed on a polymer substrate, as opposed to cotton fibre, were announced; the first of these polymer notes, the $100 bill, began circulation on November 14, 2011, the $50 bill began circulation on March 26, 2012, the $20 denomination began circulation on November 7, 2012, and the $5 and $10 denominations began circulation on November 12, 2013.

Since 1935, all banknotes are printed by the Ottawa-based Canadian Bank Note Company under contract to the Bank of Canada. Previously, a second company, BA International (founded in 1866 as the British American Bank Note Company), shared printing duties. In 2011, BA International announced it would close its banknote printing business and cease printing banknotes at the end of 2012; since then, the Canadian Bank Note Company has been the sole printer of Canadian banknotes.

All banknotes from series prior to the established polymer series are considered unfit for circulation due to their lacking of any modern security features, such as a metallic stripe. Financial institutions must return the banknotes to the Bank of Canada, which will then destroy them. Individuals may keep the banknotes indefinitely.

== Legal tender ==
As of January 1, 2021, the $1, $2, $25, $500 and $1000 notes issued by the Bank of Canada are no longer legal tender. All other Canadian dollar banknotes issued by the Bank of Canada remain as legal tender in Canada. However, commercial transactions may legally be settled in any manner agreed by the parties involved.

Legal tender of Canadian coinage is governed by the Currency Act, which sets out limits of:

- $40 if the denomination is $2 or greater but does not exceed $10;
- $25 if the denomination is $1;
- $10 if the denomination is 10¢ or greater but less than $1;
- $5 if the denomination is 5¢;
- 25¢ if the denomination is 1¢.

Retailers in Canada may refuse bank notes without breaking the law. According to legal guidelines, the method of payment has to be mutually agreed upon by the parties involved with the transactions. For example, stores may refuse $100 banknotes if they feel that would put them at risk of being counterfeit victims; however, official policy suggests that the retailers should evaluate the impact of that approach. In the case that no mutually acceptable form of payment can be found for the tender, the parties involved should seek legal advice.

Canadian dollars, especially coins, are accepted by some businesses in both the northernmost cities of the United States and many Canadian snowbird enclaves, just as US dollars are accepted by some Canadian businesses.

In 2012, Iceland considered adopting the Canadian dollar as a stable alternative to the Icelandic króna. Canada was favoured due to its northern geography and similar resource-based economy, in addition to its relative economic stability. The Canadian ambassador to Iceland said that Iceland could adopt the currency, although Iceland ultimately decided not to implement the proposal.

== Value ==
The cost of one United States dollar in Canadian dollars from 1990

The cost of one Euro in Canadian dollars from 1999

Since around 76.7% of Canada's exports go to the US, and 53.3% of imports into Canada come from the US, Canadians are interested in the value of their currency mainly against the US dollar. Although domestic concerns arise when the dollar trades much lower than its US counterpart, there is also concern among exporters when the dollar appreciates quickly. A rise in the value of the dollar increases the price of Canadian exports to the US. On the other hand, there are advantages to a rising dollar, in that it is cheaper for Canadian industries to purchase foreign material and businesses.

The Bank of Canada has no target value for the Canadian dollar and has not intervened in foreign exchange markets since 1998. The Bank's official position is that market conditions should determine the worth of the Canadian dollar, although it occasionally makes minor attempts to influence its value.

On world markets, the Canadian dollar historically tended to move in tandem with the US dollar. An apparently rising Canadian dollar (against the US dollar) was decreasing against other international currencies; however, during the rise of the Canadian dollar between 2002 and 2013, it gained value against the US dollar as well as other international currencies. In recent years, dramatic fluctuations in the value of the Canadian dollar have tended to correlate with shifts in oil prices, reflecting the Canadian dollar's status as a petrocurrency owing to Canada's significant oil exports.

The Canadian dollar traded at a record high of US$2.78 in terms of the American greenbacks on July 11, 1864, since the latter was inconvertible paper currency. However, the Canadian dollar remained close to par or 1:1 versus the gold or silver US dollar of the time.

Unlike other currencies in the Bretton Woods system, whose values were fixed, the Canadian dollar was allowed to float from 1950 to 1962. Between 1952 and 1960, the Canadian dollar traded at a slight premium over the US dollar, reaching a high of US$1.0614 on August 20, 1957.

The Canadian dollar fell considerably after 1960, and this contributed to Prime Minister John Diefenbaker's defeat in the 1963 election. The Canadian dollar returned to a fixed exchange rate regime in 1962 when its value was set at US$0.925, where it remained until 1970.

As an inflation-fighting measure, the Canadian dollar was allowed to float in 1970. Its value appreciated and it was worth more than the US dollar for part of the 1970s. The high point was on April 25, 1974, when it reached US$1.0443.

The Canadian dollar fell in value against its American counterpart during the technological boom of the 1990s that was centred in the United States, and was traded for as little as US$0.6179 on January 21, 2002, which was an all-time low. Since then, its value against all major currencies rose until 2013, due in part to high prices for commodities (especially oil) that Canada exports.

The Canadian dollar's value against the US dollar rose sharply in 2007 because of the continued strength of the Canadian economy and the US currency's weakness on world markets. During trading on September 20, 2007, it met the US dollar at parity for the first time since November 25, 1976.

Inflation in the value of the Canadian dollar has been fairly low since the 1990s. In 2007 the Canadian dollar rebounded, soaring 23% in value.

On September 28, 2007, the Canadian dollar closed above the US dollar for the first time in 30 years, at US$1.0052. On November 7, 2007, it hit US$1.1024 during trading, a modern-day high after China announced it would diversify its US$1.43 trillion foreign exchange reserve away from the US dollar. By November 30, however, the Canadian dollar was once again at par with the US dollar, and on December 4, the dollar had retreated back to US$0.98, through a cut in interest rates made by the Bank of Canada due to concerns about exports to the United States. Due to its soaring value and new record highs at the time, the Canadian dollar was named the Canadian Newsmaker of the Year for 2007 by the Canadian edition of Time magazine.

Since the late 2000s, the Canadian dollar has been valued at levels comparable to the years before its swift rise in 2007. For most of the 2010s, the exchange rate of Canadian to US dollars was approximately US$0.70 to Can$1.00.

== Reserve currency ==
Most traded currencies by value Currency distribution of global foreign exchange market turnover
Currency	ISO 4217 code	Proportion of daily volume		Change (2022–2025)
Currency	ISO 4217 code	April 2022	April 2025	Change (2022–2025)
United States dollar	USD	88.4%	89.2%	▲0.8pp
Euro	EUR	30.6%	28.9%	▼1.7pp
Japanese yen	JPY	16.7%	16.8%	▲0.1pp
Pound sterling	GBP	12.9%	10.2%	▼2.7pp
Renminbi	CNY	7.0%	8.5%	▲1.5pp
Swiss franc	CHF	5.2%	6.4%	▲1.2pp
Australian dollar	AUD	6.4%	6.1%	▼0.3pp
Canadian dollar	CAD	6.2%	5.8%	▼0.4pp
Hong Kong dollar	HKD	2.6%	3.8%	▲1.2pp
Singapore dollar	SGD	2.4%	2.4%	Steady
Indian rupee	INR	1.6%	1.9%	▲0.3pp
South Korean won	KRW	1.8%	1.8%	Steady
Swedish krona	SEK	2.2%	1.6%	▼0.6pp
Mexican peso	MXN	1.5%	1.6%	▲0.1pp
New Zealand dollar	NZD	1.7%	1.5%	▼0.2pp
Norwegian krone	NOK	1.7%	1.3%	▼0.4pp
New Taiwan dollar	TWD	1.1%	1.2%	▲0.1pp
Brazilian real	BRL	0.9%	0.9%	Steady
South African rand	ZAR	1.0%	0.8%	▼0.2pp
Polish złoty	PLN	0.7%	0.8%	▲0.1pp
Danish krone	DKK	0.7%	0.7%	Steady
Indonesian rupiah	IDR	0.4%	0.7%	▲0.3pp
Turkish lira	TRY	0.4%	0.5%	▲0.1pp
Thai baht	THB	0.4%	0.5%	▲0.1pp
Israeli new shekel	ILS	0.4%	0.4%	Steady
Hungarian forint	HUF	0.3%	0.4%	▲0.1pp
Czech koruna	CZK	0.4%	0.4%	Steady
Chilean peso	CLP	0.3%	0.3%	Steady
Philippine peso	PHP	0.2%	0.2%	Steady
Colombian peso	COP	0.2%	0.2%	Steady
Malaysian ringgit	MYR	0.2%	0.2%	Steady
UAE dirham	AED	0.4%	0.1%	▼0.3pp
Saudi riyal	SAR	0.2%	0.1%	▼0.1pp
Romanian leu	RON	0.1%	0.1%	Steady
Peruvian sol	PEN	0.1%	0.1%	Steady
Other currencies		2.6%	3.4%	▲0.8pp
Total (Note: The total sum is 200% because each currency trade is counted twice: once for the currency being bought and once for the currency being sold. The percentages above represent the proportion of all trades involving a given currency, regardless of which side of the transaction it is on.)		200.0%	200.0%	

A number of central banks (and commercial banks) keep Canadian dollars as a reserve currency. The Canadian dollar is considered to be a benchmark currency.

In the economy of the Americas, the Canadian dollar plays a similar role to that of the Australian dollar (AUD) in the Asia-Pacific region. The Canadian dollar (as a regional reserve currency for banking) has been an important part of the British, French and Dutch Caribbean states' economies and finance systems since the 1950s. The Canadian dollar is held by many central banks in Central and South America as well.

By observing how the Canadian dollar behaves against the US dollar, foreign exchange economists can indirectly observe internal behaviours and patterns in the US economy that could not be seen by direct observation. The Canadian dollar has fully evolved into a global reserve currency only since the 1970s, when it was floated against all other world currencies. Some economists have attributed the rise of importance of the Canadian dollar to the long-term effects of the Nixon Shock that effectively ended the Bretton Woods system of global finance.

== Exchange rates ==
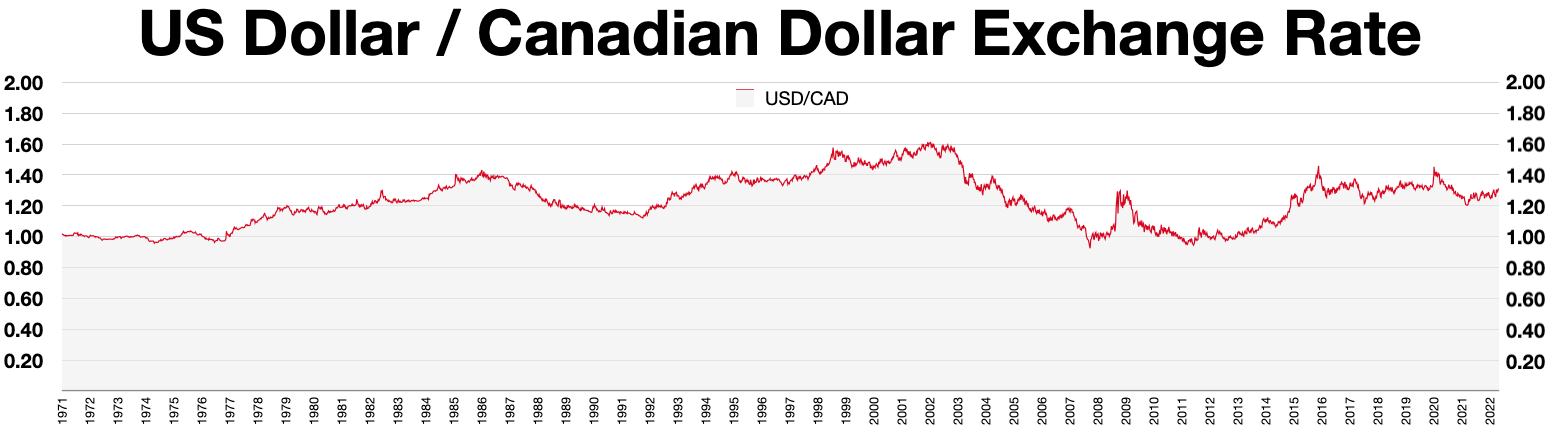
USD/CAD exchange rate 1971–2022

Current CAD exchange rates
From Google Finance:	AUD CHF CNY EUR GBP HKD JPY USD
From Yahoo! Finance:	AUD CHF CNY EUR GBP HKD JPY USD
From XE.com:	AUD CHF CNY EUR GBP HKD JPY USD
From OANDA:	AUD CHF CNY EUR GBP HKD JPY USD

== See also ==
- Economy of Canada
- List of countries by leading trade partners
- List of the largest trading partners of Canada
