= Halifax rating =

The Halifax rating was a valuation of the Spanish dollar in the £sd accounting system. It set the Spanish dollar at a value of 5 shillings (60 pence) and was established c.1750 in Halifax, Nova Scotia. The rating was set 6 pence higher than the actual silver content of the coins, in an effort to keep the coins in circulation, as there was no advantage to melting the coins for their bullion content.

The Halifax rating was used officially in Upper and Lower Canada until 1841 when the gold standard was adopted for the dollar; however, United Empire Loyalists brought the York rating into Upper Canada, where it persisted well into the 19th century despite its outlawing (in favour of the Halifax rating) in 1796.
