= Launi Skinner =

Canadian businesswoman

- Born: 1964 (age 61–62)
- Citizenship: Canadian
- Education: Okanagan College
- Occupation: Business executive
- Title: CEO of Tru Cooperative Bank (since 2010)
- Predecessor: Gord Huston

Launi Skinner is a Canadian business executive who is chief executive officer at Tru Cooperative Bank, formerly First West Credit Union. She previously was president of Starbucks Coffee U.S., and president and chief operating officer at 1-800-GOT-JUNK?.

== Early life and education ==
Skinner grew up in the municipality of Summerland, located in British Columbia's Okanagan region, and as a teenager worked at a pharmacy where she has said she experienced her first examples of great leadership in business.

Skinner studied business administration at Okanagan College, and after earning her diploma, completed her accreditation as a Certified General Accountant (CGA).

== Career ==
While studying for her accounting designation, Skinner worked as an account supervisor, district manager and merchandise manager for Mohawk Oil and Convenience Stores. Later, she became a regional manager with McGavin Foods.

=== Starbucks Coffee ===
In 1993, Skinner joined Starbucks as district manager for Vancouver and held positions including senior vice president of store development until being appointed president of Starbucks U.S. in 2007. In 2008 she resigned after 14.5 years with Starbucks and returned to Vancouver where she joined Canadian waste removal company 1-800-GOT-JUNK? as its president and chief operating officer.

=== Tru Cooperative Bank ===
In 2010, Skinner was appointed chief executive officer of First West Credit Union, four months after the January 1, 2010, merger of Valley First Credit Union and Envision Credit Union. During Skinner's tenure, First West Credit Union acquired Enderby & District Credit Union in 2013, and merged with Vancouver Island-based Island Savings Credit Union in 2015. In 2026, under Skinner's leadership, First West Credit Union became a federally regulated credit union and changed its name to Tru Cooperative Bank.

In a sponsored interview with The Canadian Press in May 2026, Skinner claimed that the term credit union was not well-understood in Canada, and that First West Credit Union's name change to Tru Cooperative Bank was intended to clarify the organization's nature as a member-owned financial institution.

=== Boards and community involvements ===
Skinner's present roles include:

- Chair, board of directors, BC Cancer's BC Cancer Foundation
- Board of directors, Business Council of British Columbia
- Board of directors, Armstrong Hospitality Group/Rocky Mountaineer

In the past, Skinner's involvements have also included:

- Chair, Metro Vancouver YWCA Women of Distinction Awards (2010–2011)
- Board of directors, Science World
- Board of governors, Kwantlen Polytechnic University (2010–2014)
- Community leader, Minerva Foundation BC
- Board of directors, Qtrade Financial Group

== Awards and recognition ==
Skinner is a four-time recipient of the Women's Executive Network's (WXN) Canada's Most Powerful Women: Top 100 Award, having received the accolade in 2010, 2011, 2012, and 2014, earning her entrance into WXN's Hall of Fame. She was also recognized by Business in Vancouver as one of the Most Influential Women in Business in 2011. In 2007, Skinner was included as one of the "Four Women to Watch" in Fortune Magazine's 50 Most Power Women feature. Internationally, Skinner received the 2011 Stevie Award for Best Canadian Executive.

In 2014, Skinner received an honorary doctorate from the British Columbia Institute of Technology.
