= Credit unions in Canada =

Credit unions are financial institutions that are owned and controlled by their members. Unlike investor-owned financial institutions, credit unions provide an alternative to traditional as cooperative enterprises. Credit unions are part of the global cooperative network and operate under the 7 guiding cooperative principles. Each credit union is owned locally by its members and all members have an equal say in how their credit union operates through a democratic process.

Canada has significant per-capita membership in credit unions, which represents more than a third of the working-age population. Credit union membership is largest in Quebec, where they are known as caisses populaires (people's banks).

== Credit union products and services ==
Credit unions offer traditional financial products and services including chequing and savings accounts, mortgages, consumer loans and lines of credit, business loans and registered savings plan. They offer day to day banking services like chequing accounts, savings accounts, saving and investing products and advice, and small business services and commercial lending. Together, the credit union sector is the largest lnder to small businesses in Canada. Most credit unions rely on partnerships to offer additional financial products and services like wealth management services, credit cards, insurance, estate planning, and investing mutual funds and stocks.

== Credit union popularization in Canada ==
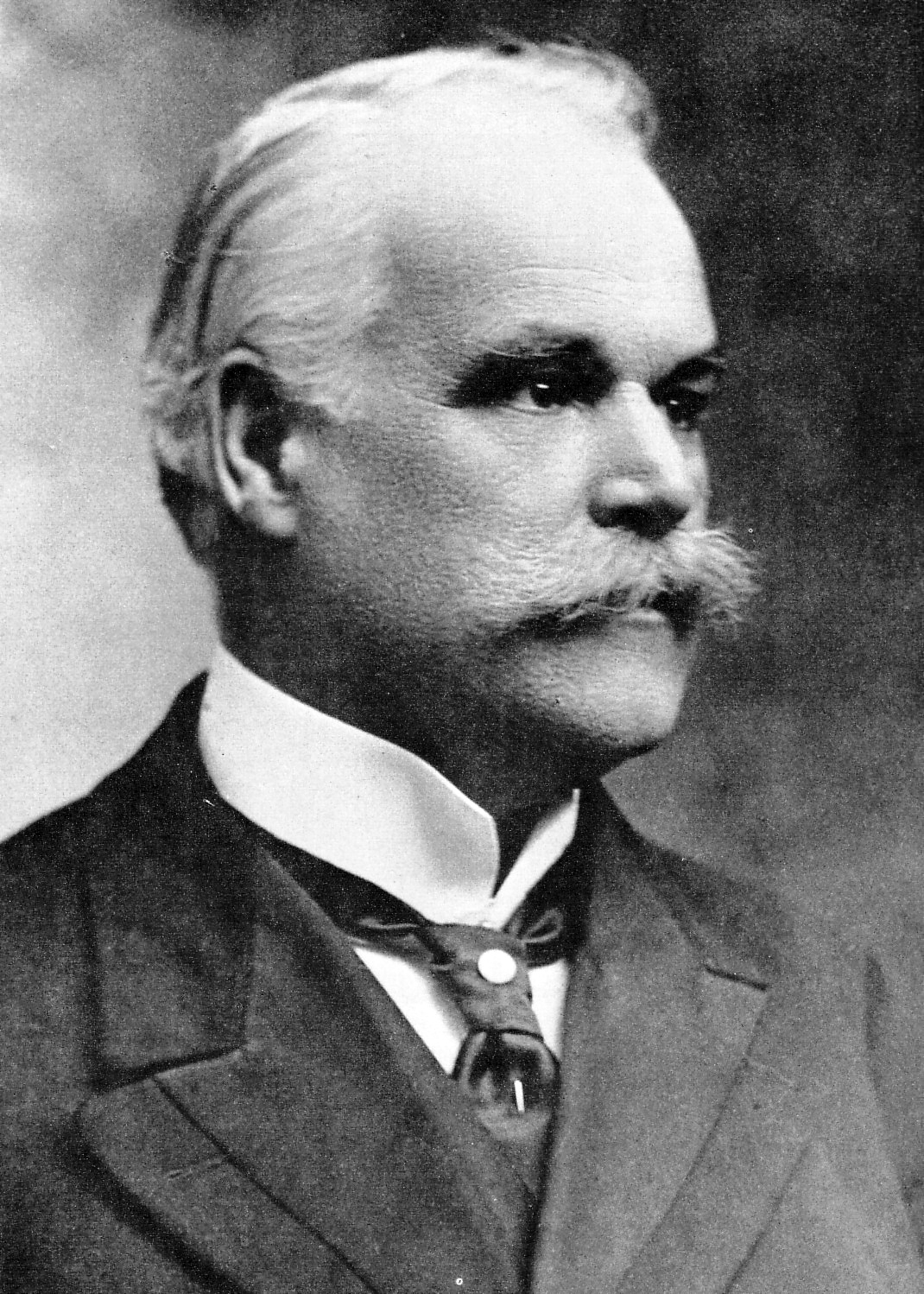
Alphonse Desjardins, the founder of the caisses populaires (credit unions) in North America.

The first credit union in Canada was founded in Quebec in 1900 by Alphonse Desjardins in response to exploitative lending practices. Over the next fourteen years he founded an additional 149 caisses populaires throughout Quebec and Ontario. Caisses populaires and credit unions played fundamental roles in creating financial independence and quickly became popular across all of Canada. By 1920, Alphonse Desjardins helped establish over 200 caisses throughout Quebec, Ontario, and the US.

1900: The first credit union in North America, La Caisse populaire de Lévis (Québec) was founded by Alphonse Desjardins.

1910: The first credit union outside of Quebec was launched with the assistance of Alphonse Desjardins. Caisse Sainte-Famille was the first of 18 caisses established between 1910-1913 in French speaking Ontario.

1910: Saskatchewan credit unions were launched in response to harsh economic times and drought. The Jewish Colonization Association was established in 1910 and the first credit union to become officially chartered was Regina Hebrew Savings & Credit Union.

1932: Reserve Mines Credit Union in Cape Breton was the first credit union in Nova Scotia. Credit unions grew rapidly in Atlantic Canada during the great depression following the Antigonish Movement.

1936: Credit unions began to emerge in both Prince Edward Island, New Brunswick and Newfoundland & Labrador.

1937: St. Malo was the first credit union to be chartered in Manitoba as a result of suffering farmers coming together and pooling resources. By 1939 there were 19 credit unions in Manitoba.

1938: Inglewood Savings and Credit Union of Calgary became the first to incorporate in Alberta as a result of community banding together, pooling resources and providing loans to community members.

1939: Powell River Credit Union became the province's first chartered credit union in BC in response to difficulty of working class people in obtaining loans and mortgages.

=== Credit union centrals ===
Credit unions organized provincial cooperative credit societies and credit union leagues which facilitated the exchange of savings across credit unions and helped credit unions become more efficient. Today, each province has a credit union central, with the exception of Atlantic Canada where the centrals merged into Atlantic Central in 2007. The credit union centrals are owned by their member credit unions. In most provinces the central facilitates clearing and settlement activities, provides credit facilities to support credit unions in managing their cash flow, facilitates emergency liquidity support and provides various other services. In Atlantic Canada, Atlantic Central serves as the regional trade association for Atlantic Canadian credit unions.

== Credit union sector statistics ==
Credit unions and caisses populaires (excluding Desjardins)

Credit union sector statistics (as of Q4 2025)
	Total credit unions	Total locations	Total membership	Total deposits	Total loans	Total assets
British Columbia*	26	352	2,118,891	$91,016	$88,537	$106,729
Alberta	12	190	717,006	$29,525	$30,601	$35,992
Saskatchewan*	31	222	528,082	$29,138	$26,176	$34,392
Manitoba	15	171	747,744	$42,138	$41,218	$48,197
Ontario	48	483	1,612,872	$71,389	$77,688	$89,326
New Brunswick*	7	66	212,873	$5,898	$5,825	$7,050
Nova Scotia	18	69	144,201	$4,431	$3,710	$5,168
Prince Edward Island	4	13	47,711	$2,048	$1,800	$2,242
Newfoundland & Labrador	6	37	58,553	$1,618	$1,448	$1,797
Total	167	1603	6,187,933	$277,200	$277,544	$330,892

*British Columbia, Saskatchewan and New Brunswick results include federal credit unions.

Desjardins credit unions and caisses populaires

Province	Total credit unions	Total locations	Total membership	Total deposits	Total loans	Total assets
Quebec & Ontario	199	366	5,257,688	$386,937	$392,161	$433,060

== Credit union regulation and deposit insurance coverage ==
=== Federally regulated credit unions ===
Legislation was adopted under the federal Bank Act in 2012 to allow for the creation of federal credit unions. On July 1, 2016, the Caisse Populaire Acadienne ltée (later rebranded as UNI Financial Cooperation), with its 155,000 members, became the first federal credit union in Canada. Coast Capital Savings announced the approval from OSFI to become the second federally regulated credit union in Canada beginning on November 1, 2018, the first federal credit union based in British Columbia. Innovation Federal Credit Union became the first federal credit union headquartered in Saskatchewan on June 23, 2023. On April 1, 2026 First West Credit Union changed its legal name to Tru Cooperative Bank, upon federal continuance becoming Canada's fourth federally regulated credit union.

Credit union	Founded	Federally expanded
UNI Financial Cooperation	1946	2016
Coast Capital Savings	1940	2018
Innovation Federal Credit Union	2007	2023
Tru Cooperative Bank, formerly First West Credit Union	1946	2026

Federal credit unions are regulated by the Office of the Superintendent of Financial Institutions and the Financial Consumer Agency of Canada. The Canada Deposit Insurance Corporation provides deposit insurance coverage for federally regulated credit unions, which are chartered under the Canada Bank Act.

=== Provincially regulated credit unions ===
==== Outside Quebec ====
As of March 2026, there were a total of 161 independently operated credit and caisses populaires operating 1603 locations in the nine provinces outside of Quebec holding combined consolidated assets of 330.9 billion CAD.

The largest provincially regulated credit unions in order of asset size include Vancity, Servus Credit Union, Meridian Credit Union, Desjardins Ontario Credit Union, Access Credit Union, Beem Credit Union, Steinbach Credit Union and Assiniboine Credit Union.

Provincially regulated credit unions have deposit insurance coverage that protects member deposits. Credit union regulator and deposit insurance provider varies across provinces.

Province	Provincial regulator	Deposit insurance provider
Alberta	Credit Union Deposit Guarantee Corporation	Credit Union Deposit Guarantee Corporation
British Columbia	BC Financial Services Authority	Credit Union Deposit Insurance Corporation of British Columbia
Manitoba	Deposit Guarantee Corporation of Manitoba	Deposit Guarantee Corporation of Manitoba
New Brunswick	Financial and Consumer Services Commission	New Brunswick Credit Union Deposit Insurance Corporation
Newfoundland & Labrador	Department of Digital Government and Service NL	Credit Union Deposit Guarantee Corporation
Nova Scotia	Nova Scotia Department of Finance	Nova Scotia Credit Union Deposit Insurance Corporation
Ontario	Financial Services Regulation Authority	Deposit Insurance Reserve Fund
Prince Edward Island	Department of Justice and Public Safety	Credit Union Deposit Insurance Fund
Saskatchewan	Credit Union Deposit Guarantee Corporation	Credit Union Deposit Guarantee Corporation

==== Within Quebec ====
Within Quebec there are 204 caisses that are formally federated with Desjardins as of September 2024.

Desjardins group is regulated by Autorité des marchés financiers (AMF) who also provides deposit insurance coverage.

== Credit unions and digital banking ==
Businesses across various industries are facing digital transformation with the adoption of cloud-based technologies. Technological advances have transformed banking practices all over the world, turning traditional banking into fintech; the use of technology to provide new or improved financial services. The development of fintech poses challenges for small and medium sized enterprises, including credit unions, as such entities often have fewer resources to build modern digital and technological infrastructure.

Many financial institutions and credit unions are in the midst of a digital transformation. One of the biggest considerations for financial institutions is their core banking platform. The process for digital transformation for credit union involves several phases:

Phase		Description
1	Shadow IT Audit	Gain an understanding of every tool used by every team
2	Core Banking Upgrade	1. Full core conversion replaces the entire core banking with a cloud-based or modern platform 2. Core-adjacent modernization integrates a modern layer around existing core banking to allow for API integration with other programs, platforms or SaaS.; 3. A hybid approach keeps core banking for some tasks, but uses cloud-based or more modern technologies for others
3	AI Integration into existing workflows	AI integration can be used for loan processing, member service, compliance monitoring or back-office automation
4	Member Experience Transformation	Digital onboarding, personalized communication, omni-channel service delivery, self-service capabilities, measuring member experience
5	Compliance	Engage regulatory bodies, document due diligence measures taken throughout the process,

Undergoing a digital transformation can be extremely time consuming, complex, and expensive. Data cooperatives can be considered viable solutions for these issues creating avenues cost saving, collective decision-making and a more inclusive and equitable digital ecosystem and can foster digital solidarity. Lana et al (2025) suggest that investments in fintech may also improve economic and financial performance of credit unions in the long term.

The cooperative and collective digital transformation to cloud-based banking in Atlantic Canada is an example of the power of digital cooperatives. In Atlantic Canada, 35 credit unions migrated to cloud-based banking between 2024 and 2025. This was a collective full core banking migration which was led by League Data, a data cooperative and aggregator of services that is cooperatively owned by credit unions in the region. This major digital milestone impacted over three hundred thousand members across 130 branches.

Investments in digital technology and core banking enable credit unions to participate in Open Banking allowing financial data to be shared between financial institutions and third-party fintech providers through API integration. On March 26th 2026 Bill C-15 reached royal assent and on June 10th, 2026 the first credit union activated open banking.

== The future of credit unions in Canada ==
Capitalist practices in financial services in Canada have widely been exploitative and harmful with only a few big banks controlling the majority of capital in Canada. Canadian credit unions have an opportunity to complete with the big banks in a way that could be influential enough to inspire widespread social change. With the cost of borrowing continuing to rise, Canada will need to enable more competition in the financial sector in order to reduce prices and inflation over time.

While the number of credit unions rose drastically early on, over time many credit unions have merged and branches consolidated. This trend continues in 2026 with merger announcements from coast to coast. Credit union consolidations are necessary to build the scale required to compete with the country’s largest banks. In order to seize the opportunity to compete in the federal marketplace, the credit union sector may continue to see mergers and consolidations to gain the scale to compete federally.

== See also ==
- Banking in Canada
- Credit unions in the United Kingdom
- Credit unions in the United States
- Accel (interbank network) § The Exchange Network
