= Launi =

Surname list

Launi is a given name. Notable people with the name include:

- Launi Meili (born 1963), American sports shooter
- Launi Skinner (born 1964), Canadian business woman

== See also ==
- Launis
