= Bank of Montreal v Innovation Credit Union =

- Supreme Court of Canada

Hearing: April 19, 2010 Judgment: November 5, 2010
- Full case name: Bank of Montreal v. Innovation Credit Union
- Citations: 2010 SCC 47, [2010] 3 S.C.R. 3
- Docket No.: 33153
- Prior history: Appeal from a judgment of the Saskatchewan Court of Appeal, reversing a decision of the Court of Queen's Bench for Saskatchewan.
- Ruling: Appeal dismissed.

Holding
- The Bank Act provides no express priority rule vis à vis prior security interests.

Court membership
- Chief Justice: Beverley McLachlin; Puisne Justices: Ian Binnie, Louis LeBel, Marie Deschamps, Morris Fish, Rosalie Abella, Louise Charron, Marshall Rothstein, Thomas Cromwell

Reasons given
- Unanimous reasons by: Charron J.

Bank of Montreal v Innovation Credit Union [2010] 3 S.C.R. 3, 2010 SCC 47 is a decision of the Supreme Court of Canada that deals with the priority of unregistered security interests of a creditor against a security interest created later by a chartered bank under the Bank Act.

== Facts ==
James Buist, a farmer in Saskatchewan, borrowed money from the Innovation Credit Union in October 1991. In return, he provided the credit union with a security interest in all of his present and after-acquired personal property, which would be governed by the Personal Property Security Act (Saskatchewan). The interest was not entered into Saskatchewan's PPSA registry until June 2004.

After this loan was provided, Buist also borrowed money from the Bank of Montreal, and several security agreements were executed between 1998 and January 2004. Buist did not disclose to the bank the loan from the credit union or its security interest, and, as it had not been registered, its existence did not appear in searches of the PPSA and Bank Act registries.

The Bank's security interest was registered under the Bank Act, and the PPSA in Saskatchewan does not allow parallel registration of such interests in its registry.

Buist ultimately became insolvent, and the Bank seized some of his property that was covered by its security in December 2004. The credit union applied to the Court of Queen's Bench for Saskatchewan for a declaration that it had a priority claim over the proceeds of the disposition of that property.

== The issue ==
Was a registered security interest under the Bank Act able to defeat an unregistered security interest that operated under provincial legislation?

== The judgments below ==
The Court of Queen's Bench ruled that the Bank Act had priority by virtue of the Bank having perfected its security interest. As the judge (T.C. Zarzeczny J.) noted,

[52] In the present case the issue of perfection by registration and therefore notice to all of the security interest claimed by the Credit Union is central to the determination of this priority dispute. If the provisions of s. 428 of the Bank Act referring to "all rights subsequently acquired in, on or in respect of [that] property ..." includes priority rights then by the second rule in the Agricultural Credit Corp. of Saskatchewan case the Bank succeeds in its claim of priority in this case. Priority is obtained by the Credit Union in respect of its prior security interest only when that interest is perfected, in this case, by registration. Registration gives notice to all third parties of the nature of the security interest claimed and implicitly its priority.

This ruling was reversed on appeal to the Saskatchewan Court of Appeal. In a unanimous decision (per Jackson, J.A.), the court stated,

[52] At bottom, this is an exercise in statutory interpretation, which requires recourse to the general principles of statutory interpretation, including the need to read the words to be interpreted in their entire context. It is clear that the Bank Act provides no express priority rule vis à vis prior security interests. To read a priority rule into the Bank Act in favour of prior interests, and thereby defeat Bank Act security in all cases would have far-reaching ramifications. It would raise, for example, the question as to what types of prior interests would have such effect, which was the conundrum faced by the Chambers judge in the approach that he took.

[53] A conclusion that the Bank Act relies on provincial law to determine the consequences of holding a warehouse receipt or bill of lading avoids this problem. Such a conclusion is in keeping with the history of the Bank Act, and the wording of the sections under consideration. It enhances credit, but not at the expense of prior interests duly taken and valid under the provincial system of secured transactions. It is consistent with s. 428(1), which accords priority to Bank Act security over "rights subsequently acquired," but to make this statement does not import into the section a priority rule in favour of prior rights. If Parliament did not intend to defer to provincial property law principles, there would be no mechanism to resolve this dispute in the Bank Act, and in consequence, the courts would be thrust back upon a consideration of the principles of the general law of the province including the common law and equity in any event.

[54] In summary, a bank, by virtue of the document of title fiction, acquires whatever interest the debtor has in the property at the time the bank acquired its interest. This, of course, brings us to the question of what the debtor owned in this case when the Bank acquired its interest under the Bank Act, and this, in turn, necessarily takes us to provincial law governing proprietary interests.

...

[57] According to the PPSA, an agreement in these terms creates a security interest in the property with respect to which it is granted. Clause 2(1)(qq)(i) of the PPSA defines a security interest as "an interest in personal property that secures payment or performance of an obligation." There can be no doubt, based on the terms of the General Security Agreement mentioned above, that Mr. Buist granted to the Credit Union a security interest in all his personal property.

...

[66] There are clear incentives for lending institutions to register under the PPSA, not the least of which are the consequences of holding an unperfected security interest. By failing to register a security interest, a provincial lending institution stands to be defeated by many more provincial interests than federally created ones. The problem is the age old one of a debtor failing to disclose—either negligently or fraudulently—that it has borrowed money elsewhere. The PPSA provides a solution for the banks as well, but only if they take a security interest under that Act and not under the Bank Act in this jurisdiction, which is a solution that has been adopted elsewhere.

[67] In short, in the within appeal, the Bank cannot insist on registration under a system of which it is not a part and that it has not adopted. The Credit Union is entitled to priority over the Bank of Montreal by virtue of the Credit Union's prior security interest. The priority rule, resting as it does on ss. 427(2) and 435 of the Bank Act and provincial law, does not depend on whether the prior security interest is perfected.

== Decision of the Supreme Court of Canada ==
The appellate decision was upheld unanimously by the Supreme Court. While it generally agreed with that decision, the court detailed what it felt to be the correct reasoning in arriving at the result.

The Saskatchewan CA had relied on its previous decision in Royal Bank of Canada v. Agricultural Credit Corp. of Saskatchewan, which had laid down some basic rules for resolving priority issues:

1. set aside the PPSA from the analysis and determine the priority as if the PPSA did not exist;
2. determine the priority pursuant to [applicable provisions of the Bank Act] to the extent it is possible to do so;
3. where appropriate, apply the first-in-time priority rule.

The SCC stated that, while this approach did not lead the Court of Appeal into error in deciding this case, this formulation does not accurately reflect the applicable constitutional principles at play. Step 2 is correct, but Step 1 properly means that internal priority rules of the PPSA have no bearing on determining a priority dispute between Bank Act and PPSA security interests.

However, the PPSA retains importance in resolving the priority dispute at issue:

- As the SCC held in Bank of Montreal v. Hall, the Bank Act security provisions are valid federal legislation which cannot be subject to the operation of provincially enacted priority provisions.
- Thus, where the Bank Act contains an express priority provision that is applicable to a particular priority dispute, that provision will govern.
- In determining what interest the debtor may have already conveyed to another creditor and, in such circumstances, what interest he or she had left to convey to the bank at the time of execution of the Bank Act security agreement, it becomes necessary to resort to the provincial property law, either at common law or under applicable provincial statutes. It is at this point that resorting to the PPSA becomes relevant.
- It is true that the internal priority rules of the PPSA cannot be invoked to resolve the dispute. However, it does not follow that the provincial security interest created under the PPSA does not exist outside these priority rules. Nor can the fundamental changes brought about by the PPSA be ignored in determining the nature of the prior competing interest. Far from being irrelevant under the Bank Act, provincial property law plays a complementary role in defining the rights granted under the Bank Act.
- A PPSA security interest, just as a Bank Act security interest, is a statutorily created interest and, as such, an interest recognized at law.
- Having a PPSA security interest in collateral does not give a creditor full right and title to the collateral. Rather, a PPSA security interest gives the secured creditor an interest in the property to the extent of the debtor's obligation.

As noted by the Court:

[48] In my view, it is not open to the Bank in this appeal to now argue that the statutory interest conveyed to the Credit Union is not analogous to a proprietary right. At the time Buist gave the Bank of Montreal its Bank Act security interest, Innovation Credit Union already held a valid security interest in the nature of a fixed charge. This means that any subsequent interest could only be taken in respect of Buist's equity of redemption in the property.

[49] Nor can I accept the argument that the lack of perfection affects this characterization. Under the PPSA, the time of perfection, or the lack of perfection, determines which of two or more competing security interests takes priority. It does not determine the nature or validity of the interest. With the introduction of the PPSA, the legislation no longer declares unregistered interests void. Section 10 of the PPSA specifies what criteria must be met for a security interest to be enforceable against third parties. As the Bank acknowledges at para. 22 of its factum: "The principal requirement in a situation such as this, where the collateral is tangible equipment, is that pursuant to s. 10(1)(d) there must be a signed security agreement that contains a description of the collateral." It is not disputed that this requirement is met in this case.

...

[70] In summary, a proper interpretation of the Bank Act gives an earlier unperfected PPSA interest priority over a subsequent Bank Act interest, and there is no provision in the PPSA which subordinates an unperfected PPSA interest to a Bank Act interest.

== Significance ==
This decision has reinforced requirements for banks to practice due diligence in lending to prospective borrowers. They will also need to consider in which cases PPSA registration will be preferable to that under the Bank Act.

In response to this decision, the Parliament of Canada has amended the Bank Act to explicitly state that registry under its provisions will also take priority over unperfected security interests, except where a bank is already aware of their existence. Royal assent was given on 29 March 2012, and the relevant provisions came into force on 24 May 2012.

== See also ==
- List of Supreme Court of Canada cases (McLachlin Court)
