= Island Savings =

- Industry: Financial services
- Founded: Duncan & District Credit Union: 1951
- Headquarters: Duncan, British Columbia, Canada
- Key people: Kendall Gross, President
- Website: www.islandsavings.ca
- Footnotes; Institution number: 809 (Tru Cooperative Bank)

Island Savings is a regional financial services brand operating in British Columbia, Canada. It is a division of Tru Cooperative Bank (formerly First West Credit Union), a federally regulated credit union.

The brand was established in 1951 as the Duncan & District Credit Union. Later changing its name to Island Savings, the credit union began to grow and joined then First West Credit Union in 2015, upholding its regional trade name through Tru Cooperative Banks multi-brand strategy.

Island Savings offers retail banking, commercial and business banking and wealth management services through branches, a Member Advice Centre, and digital banking channels. Island Savings operates a network of 13 branches located across Vancouver Island and the Southern Gulf Islands and it has regional administration centres located in Victoria and Duncan.

== History ==
=== Early origins ===
Island Savings' roots trace back to community-based credit unions on Vancouver Island, including Duncan & District Credit Union, founded in 1951. Historical research on Island Savings describes its development as part of the wider British Columbia credit-union movement, with local ownership, member participation, and community-based financial services forming the basis of its early identity.

- 1950-1951 origins: Lake Cowichan’s first credit union was established by local residents in 1950, while Duncan & District Credit Union was founded in 1951, giving the later Island Savings network roots in multiple Cowichan Valley communities.
- Salt Spring Island expansion: Archival Salt Spring Island sources document the presence and development of local credit-union services on the island before their later connection to Island Savings.
- Lake Cowichan acquisition: Island Savings acquired the assets and assumed the liabilities of Lake Cowichan & District Credit Union effective December 31, 2004, allowing it to continue the business of both credit unions.

Through these mergers and local expansions, Island Savings developed a regional presence in communities including Nanaimo, Victoria, Ladysmith, Salt Spring Island, and Lake Cowichan. Its archived "Our Past" timeline provides examples of the milestones that shaped this growth, including branch development, name changes, and consolidation with neighbouring credit unions.

=== Joining First West Credit Union (2015) ===
In 2013, Island Savings entered into merger discussions with First West Credit Union, another British Columbian cooperative financial institution whose geographic trade area included the Lower Mainland, Fraser Valley, Okanagan Valley, Similkameen Valley, Thompson Valley, and Kitimat. The proposal followed earlier merger discussions reported in 2008 that did not proceed after member voting, making the First West transaction part of a longer period of consolidation discussion within the credit-union sector. In November 2014, nearly 80 per cent of voting Island Savings members approved the merger with First West, and the merger became effective on January 1, 2015.

Following the merger, First West continued its multi-brand strategy, with Island Savings operating as a regional division alongside Envision Financial, Valley First, and Enderby & District Financial.

=== Transition to Tru Cooperative Bank (2021–2026) ===
In 2021, members of First West Credit Union voted on a special resolution to apply to continue as a federal credit union under the Bank Act. With approval, First West Credit Union became a federally regulated credit union on April 1, 2026 and adopted the name Tru Cooperative Bank. The federal charter enabled the organization to serve members beyond British Columbia while retaining its cooperative structure.

== Relationship to Tru Cooperative Bank ==
Island Savings is a trade name and regional division of Tru Cooperative Bank, a federally regulated financial institution, and is not a separate legal entity.

Tru Cooperative Bank operates under a multi-brand structure that includes Island Savings, Envision Financial, Valley First, and Enderby & District Financial. Under this structure, the regional divisions retain their established brand identities while governance, regulatory oversight, and financial reporting are managed at the organizational level by Tru Cooperative Bank.

Deposits held under the Island Savings brand are insured by the Canada Deposit Insurance Corporation in accordance with federal regulations applicable to Tru Cooperative Bank.

== Business operations ==
Island Savings offers retail banking, commercial and business banking, and wealth management services.

- Retail banking - Provides consumer banking services through branches, a Member Advice Centre, and digital banking channels.
- Commercial and business banking - Provides banking services to businesses and commercial clients.
- Wealth management - Provides investment and advisory services through Island Savings Wealth Management. Local reporting also noted Island Savings’ role in expanding investment and brokerage services for members.

Island Savings’ branch network serves communities including Duncan, Chemainus, Brentwood, Lake Cowichan, Mill Bay, Nanaimo, Salt Spring Island, and Victoria, with administration centres in Duncan and Victoria.

== Cooperative structure ==
Envision Financial is a division of Tru Cooperative Bank, a federal credit union, under Canada’s Bank Act. The federal transition allows Tru Cooperative Bank to operate beyond British Columbia and expand its services to other parts of Canada.

== Community Involvement ==
Through the First West Foundation, Island Savings contributes to community organizations in British Columbia through the Island Savings Community Endowment. The endowment provides grants to eligible charitable organizations within communities served by the Island Savings division. Island Savings Financial employees also participate in volunteer initiatives organized by the institution and community partners.

Island Savings signature community program, The Full Cupboard, focuses on food insecurity by raising food, funds and awareness for food banks on Vancouver Island and the Southern Gulf Islands. Established in 2013, the program works with local food banks and Food Banks BC and has raised over $700,000 as of 2025.

== See also ==
- Tru Cooperative Bank
- Envision Financial
- Valley First
