= Valley First =

Canadian financial services brand

- Industry: Financial services
- Founded: 1947
- Headquarters: Penticton, British Columbia, Canada
- Key people: Simon Mills, President
- Website: www.valleyfirst.com
- Footnotes; Institution number: 809 (Tru Cooperative Bank)

Valley First is a regional financial services brand in British Columbia, Canada, and a trade name and regional division of Tru Cooperative Bank (formerly First West Credit Union), a federally regulated credit union.

The brand was established through the development and merger of several Interior British Columbia credit unions, including Penticton and District Credit Union, which was founded in 1947. In 2010, Valley First merged with Envision Financial to form First West Credit Union. In 2026, First West continued federally and adopted the name Tru Cooperative Bank, while Valley First was retained as one of its regional brands.

Valley First offers retail banking, commercial and business banking, and wealth management services through branches, a Member Advice Centre, and digital banking channels. Valley First operates branches and ATMs across the Okanagan, Similkameen, and Thompson regions.

== History ==
=== Early origins ===
The origins of Valley First date to the establishment of community-based credit unions in British Columbia’s interior, including Penticton and District Credit Union, founded in 1947. These institutions were created to provide cooperative financial services to local residents, particularly in resource-based and agricultural communities.

Over the following decades, the organization expanded through mergers with other regional credit unions, including Armstrong Spallumcheen Savings and Credit Union, strengthening its presence across the Okanagan and surrounding regions.

=== Formation of First West Credit Union (2010) ===
In 2008, Valley First and Envision Financial entered merger discussions to form a larger cooperative financial institution serving British Columbia. Members of both organizations approved the merger in 2009, and on January 1, 2010, the two credit unions combined to form First West Credit Union. Envision Financial and Valley First continued to operate as regional divisions of First West under their existing brand names.

=== Transition to Tru Cooperative Bank (2021–2026) ===
In 2021, members of First West Credit Union voted on a special resolution to apply to continue as a federal credit union under the Bank Act. With approval, First West Credit Union became a federally regulated credit union on April 1, 2026 and adopted the name Tru Cooperative Bank. The federal charter enabled the organization to serve members beyond British Columbia while retaining its cooperative structure.

== Relationship to Tru Cooperative Bank ==
Valley First is a trade name and regional division of Tru Cooperative Bank, a federally regulated financial institution, and is not a separate legal entity.

Tru Cooperative Bank operates under a multi-brand structure that includes Valley First, Envision Financial, Island Savings, and Enderby & District Financial. Under this structure, the regional divisions retain their established brand identities while governance, regulatory oversight, and financial reporting are managed at the organizational level by Tru Cooperative Bank.

Deposits held under the Valley First brand are insured by the Canada Deposit Insurance Corporation in accordance with federal regulations applicable to Tru Cooperative Bank.

== Business operations ==
Valley First offers retail banking, commercial and business banking, and wealth management services.

- Retail banking - Provides consumer banking services through branches, a Member Advice Centre, and digital banking channels.
- Commercial and business banking - Provides banking services to businesses and commercial clients.
- Wealth management - Provides investment and advisory services through Valley First Wealth Management.

Valley First’s branch and ATM network serves communities including Armstrong, Kamloops, Kelowna, Keremeos, Oliver, Penticton, Princeton, Vernon, and West Kelowna. Valley First also provides member support through phone, chat, appointment booking, and online help channels.

== Cooperative structure ==
Valley First is a division of Tru Cooperative Bank, a federal credit union, under Canada’s Bank Act. The federal transition allows Tru Cooperative Bank to operate beyond British Columbia and expand its services to other parts of Canada.

== Community involvement ==
Through the First West Foundation, Valley First contributes to community organizations in British Columbia through the Valley First Community Endowment. The endowment provides grants to eligible charitable organizations within communities served by the Valley First division. Valley First employees also participate in volunteer initiatives organized by the institution and community partners.

Feed the Valley is a community fundraising program established by Valley First in 2010 to support food banks in the Okanagan. The program raises food and monetary donations and works with local food banks and Food Banks BC. Valley First reported that the initiative had raised more than $3 million by 2025.

== See also ==
- Tru Cooperative Bank
- Envision Financial
- Island Savings
