= Personal Property Security Act (Canada) =

Laws regulating security interests

The Personal Property Security Act ("PPSA") is the name given to each of the statutes passed by all common law provinces, as well as the territories, of Canada that regulate the creation and registration of security interests in all personal property within their respective jurisdictions.

It is similar in structure to Article 9 of the Uniform Commercial Code in the United States, but there are important differences.

== History ==
The British Sale of Goods Act 1893 was followed closely in Canada in the first half of the twentieth century. In the 1970s it was noticed in Ontario that the law of contract had departed from the 1893 Act. To remedy this shortcoming, the Law Reform Commission proposed a new regime, which was duly enacted by the provincial government as the Uniform Sale of Goods Act.

== PPSA regime ==
The legislation that implemented the PPSA scheme was first introduced in Ontario, followed by the remaining provinces and territories (which followed a newer uniform model with notable differences). The Atlantic provinces, together with the Northwest Territories and Nunavut, have fully computerized registries, while the others have varying degrees of electronic and paper registration. The following is a brief outline of how the regime generally works.

=== Personal property subject to the Act ===
The scope of the Act is extremely broad, as it is concerned with every transaction which in substance creates a security interest, without regard to its form and without regard to the person who has title to the collateral. There are small differences between the provinces as to how far this extends, but the concept is basically the same. That said, however, there are some items that are specifically excluded:

- liens that arise from rule of law (i.e., liens that are automatically generated by legislation or precedent), unless respective legislation specifies otherwise
- interests in annuities and insurance policies
- interests in land (other than interests arising under a license), including leases
- assignments for the general benefit of creditors
- interests in any compensation for labour or personal services

Personal property is classified into the following categories:

- goods (further classified into consumer goods, equipment and inventory)
- instruments
- documents of title
- chattel paper (including leases and conditional sales contracts)
- securities
- money
- intangibles (licenses and any other matter not included above)

=== Creation of security interests ===
Security interests are created through attachment, which can be followed on by perfection.

Attachment occurs when

- value is given,
- the debtor has rights in the collateral, and
- it is enforceable against third parties.

Perfection can occur by possession of the collateral, or by registration. In certain circumstances, possession can be considered to be the superior form of perfection.

=== Purchase money security interests (PMSIs) ===
A PMSI is a special type of security interest taken in collateral by a party who gives value for the purpose of enabling the debtor to acquire rights in the collateral. Some examples are:

Type of interest	Collateral
Loan to purchase goods	The goods
Sale of goods	The goods
Leases (terms > 1 year)	The leased asset
Consignment of goods	The goods

=== Creation of "super-priorities" ===
In specified circumstances, PPSA registrants can obtain "super-priority" status over other secured parties, when the following steps are taken:

Collateral	Steps to take
Inventory	Perfection at the time of possession, provided that notice has been given to other secured parties before registration (and possession by the debtor)
Intangibles	Perfection no later than the specified number of days after attachment
Other than the above	Perfection no later than the specified number of days after possession by the debtor

=== The PPSA and land ===
PPSA security interests can have priority over real property security interests against fixtures, when the secured party registers notice against the land at the local registry or land titles office. Where attachment occurs before the affixation to the land, the interest will have priority, However, where attachment occurs after affixation, the interest is subordinate unless where the debtor otherwise consents.

Other intersections can also occur with interests in land. For example, a lender that grants a mortgage over a rental property will also register a PPSA security interest against the rents being generated, in order to attorn the rents in the event the mortgage goes into default.

=== Priorities of security interests ===
In the absence of any other special priority rules, the general order of priority is as follows:

Event	Priority given
Competing interests are perfected by registration	First interest to register
Competing interests are perfected other than by registration	First interest to perfect
One interest is perfected by registration, and the other interest other than by registration	Registered interest takes priority if registered and perfected before the other is perfected. Interest perfected other than by registration takes priority if it is perfected prior to the registration of the other interest.
Competing interests are both unperfected	First interest to attach
One interest is perfected, and the other is unperfected	Perfected interest

== Regime under Québec legislation ==
For moveable property in Québec, secured creditors create their security interests by way of hypothec through the Registre des droits personnels et réels mobiliers (RDPRM).

== Security interests created under Federal legislation ==
Federal legislation has also created certain security interests that may take precedence over provincial legislation. They notably include:

- Bank Act security for loans granted by banks
- interests in patents, copyrights and trademarks
- interests in railway and rolling stock
- federal property
- matters relating to Indians and Indian lands
- deemed trusts under taxation laws
- priorities of claims under bankruptcy and insolvency laws

== Conflicts between provincial PPSAs and federal legislation ==
S. 89(1) of the Indian Act governs the application of security interests on reserves:

89. (1) Subject to this Act, the real and personal property of an Indian or a band situated on a reserve is not subject to charge, pledge, mortgage, attachment, levy, seizure, distress or execution in favour or at the instance of any person other than an Indian or a band.

Recent jurisprudence has tended to restrict how this provision should be applied.

There can also be complex interplay with security interests under admiralty law.

== Resources by province ==
Province	PPSA Citation	Provincial registry or agent
British Columbia	RSBC 1996, c. 359	BC Registry Services
Alberta	RSA 2000, c. P‑7	Service Alberta Registries Online (registration through agents only)
Saskatchewan	SS 1993, c. P-6.2	Information Services Corporation
Manitoba	CCSM c. P35	The Property Registry of Manitoba
Ontario	RSO 1990, c. P.10	Service Ontario
New Brunswick	SNB 1993, c. P-7.1	ACOL (electronic service only)
Nova Scotia	SNS 1995-96, c. 13	ACOL (electronic service only)
Prince Edward Island	SPEI 1997, c.33, also referred to as c. P-3.1	ACOL (electronic service only)
Newfoundland and Labrador	SNL 1998, c. P-7.1	ACOL (electronic service only)
Yukon	RSY 2002, c. 169	ACOL (electronic service only) as of June 27, 2016.
Northwest Territories	SNWT 1998, c.8	ACOL (electronic service only)
Nunavut	As NWT	ACOL (electronic service only)

== Notable cases ==
- Bank of Montreal v. Innovation Credit Union

== Documents ==
- John R. Sandrelli, Christopher J. Ramsay and Anjili I. Bahadoorsingh,Remedies under Security Interests in Canada: An Overview (2002-09-18)
- Roderick J.Wood,The Concept of a Security Interest: The Canadian Experience (2011-08-18)
