= Innovation Federal Credit Union =

Canadian credit union

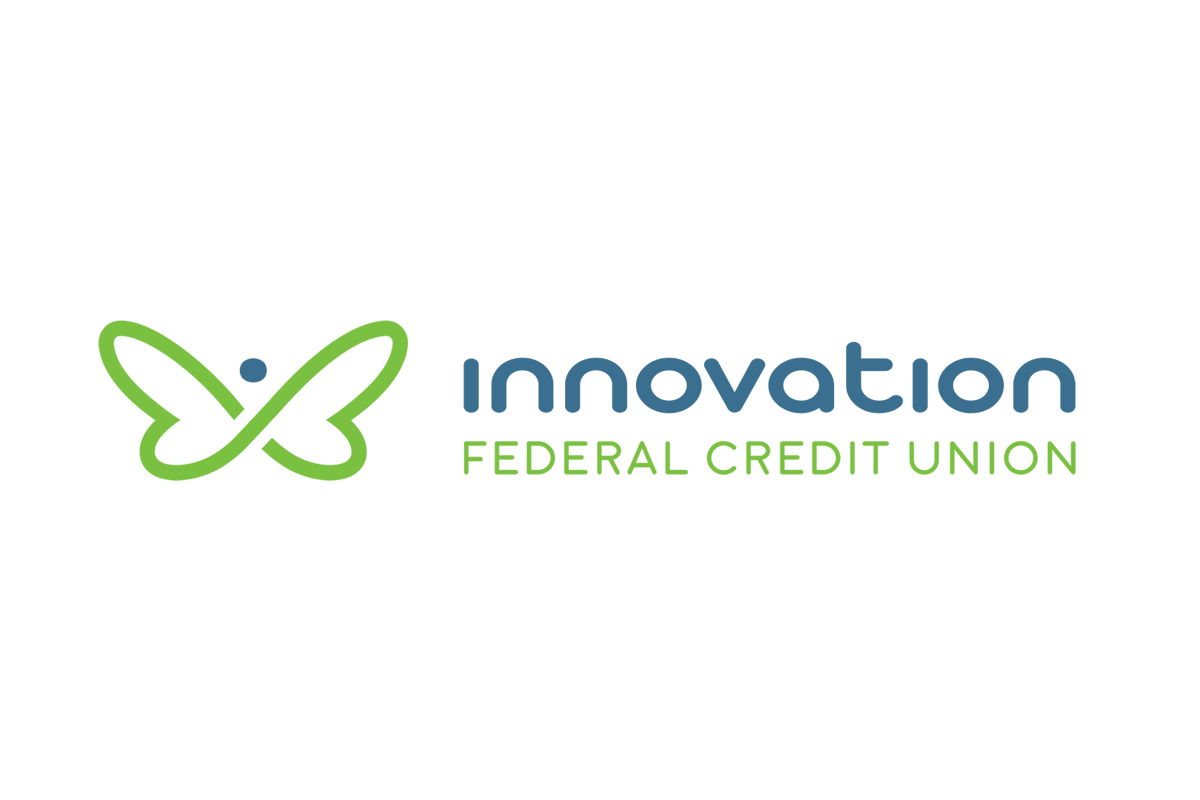
- Type: Credit union
- Industry: Financial services
- Founded: January 1, 2007; 19 years ago
- Headquarters: Swift Current, Saskatchewan
- Key people: Daniel Johnson, CEO
- Products: Savings; chequing; consumer loans; mortgages; credit cards; online banking
- Revenue: $85.5 million CAD (2021)
- Total assets: $5.8 billion CAD (2025)
- Website: www.innovationcu.ca

Innovation Federal Credit Union is a Canadian credit union. It was formed on January 1, 2007, through the merger of Southwest Credit Union and BCU Financial (previously Battlefords Credit Union). Innovation is the third largest credit union in Saskatchewan and the 21st largest credit union in Canada. Deposits are insured by the Canada Deposit Insurance Corporation (CDIC).

== History ==
When Pioneer Credit Union and Western Credit Union merged, they re-branded to Southwest Credit Union in 1993. Southwest Credit Union and BCU Financial merged January 1, 2007 to form Innovation Credit Union. This was the first financial institution in Canada to pilot Point of sale. The pilot took place in Swift Current, Saskatchewan in 1985, and involved the installation of point of sale systems at 28 Pioneer Co-op outlets.

Innovation amalgamated with ABCU Credit Union Ltd. ("ABCU") - an Alberta credit union located in the Edmonton region - on April 1, 2026. The partnership is the first interprovincial credit union merger in Canadian history.

Innovation is the 21st largest credit union in Canada, and the third largest credit union in Saskatchewan. The credit union has over 80,000+ member owners and total assets of $5.8 billion CAD (2025). Its services include banking, wealth management, credit products and services through 30 advice centres.

== Advice Centre locations ==
Innovation Credit Union refers to its physical locations as Advice Centres. Innovation has Advice Centres in the Saskatchewan communities of Buffalo Narrows, Goodsoil, Pierceland, Meadow Lake, Shell Lake, Leoville, Glaslyn, Meota, Medstead, Hafford, North Battleford, Battleford, Cut Knife, Wilke, Swift Current, Gull Lake, Cabri, Hodgeville, Gravelbourg, Frontier, Eastend, Lancer, Ponteix, La Loche, Île-à-la-Crosse, Mankota, Edmonton and Beaumont. The Credit Union also has administration offices in Regina, SK and Saskatoon, SK.

== Federal Credit Union ==
In October 2017, Innovation Credit Union provided notice of its intent to apply to become a federal credit union. The following December, Innovation Credit Union members voted in favour of a proposal to become the first federal credit union headquartered in Saskatchewan. Of 17,214 members who voted, 82% voted in favour of the Special Resolution. The Credit Union received approval to begin operating as Innovation Federal Credit Union effective June 23, 2023.This will make Innovation Federal Credit Union the first Saskatchewan credit union to be federally-regulated and the third federally-regulated credit union in Canada, with UNI Financial Cooperation being the first, and Coast Capital Savings being the second.

== Recognition ==
Innovation Credit Union was recognized as one of Canada's top 100 employers through the Annual Saskatchewan's Top Employers competition in 2018, 2017, 2016, and 2015.

In 2017, Innovation won two Achievement in Marketing Excellence (AIME) Awards, one of which was for creating the first mobile branch of any credit union in Canada. The mobile branch served small communities without financial institutions especially in the Northern part of the Province. Innovation is recognized as a Caring Company by Imagine Canada. Imagine Canada gives this designation to companies who lead by example in their community support efforts.

In 2018, Innovation Credit Union was recognized as an Employee Recommended Workplace by The Globe and Mail and Morneau Sheppel.

== Supreme Court of Canada case ==
The credit union was party to the 2010 Bank of Montreal v Innovation Credit Union case.

== See also ==
- Credit unions in Canada
- History of credit unions
- List of banks and credit unions in Canada
