= Tru Cooperative Bank =

Canadian credit union

- Type: Credit Union
- Industry: Financial services
- Founded: 1946
- Headquarters: Langley, British Columbia, Canada
- Key people: Launi Skinner, CEO
- Revenue: $342.8 million CAD (2025)
- Net income: $30.5 million CAD (2025)
- Total assets: $20.8 billion CAD (2025)
- Number of employees: 1,300 (2025)
- Website: Official website
- Footnotes; Institution number: 809 (Tru Cooperative Bank)

Tru Cooperative Bank (formerly First West Credit Union) is a member-owned cooperative financial institution headquartered in Langley, British Columbia, Canada. As of 2025, it reported approximately 290,000 members and about 1,300 employees, and reported $20.8 billion in total assets and assets under administration/management.

The credit union operates through 45 branches and provides retail banking, commercial and business banking, and wealth management services. In British Columbia, it uses four regional operating brands.

- Envision Financial, operating in the Lower Mainland, Fraser Valley, and Kitimat.
- Valley First, operating in the Southern Interior including the Okanagan and Kamloops
- Island Savings, operating in Vancouver Island and the southern Gulf Islands including Salt Spring Island
- Enderby & District Financial, operating in Enderby, British Columbia

Members voted in 2021 to apply for federal continuance, and the institution became a federally regulated credit union under the Bank Act on April 1, 2026, adopting the name Tru Cooperative Bank.

On September 22, 2026, Tru Cooperative Bank announced they had signed a memorandum of understanding to explore a proposed merger with Libro Credit Union.

== History ==
=== Early origins ===
The origins of Tru Cooperative Bank trace back to several community-based credit unions established in British Columbia in the mid-20th century, which later consolidated into regional credit unions and operating divisions within First West Credit Union.

According to the organization's corporate history, its predecessor credit unions included Valley First (with roots in Penticton & District Credit Union, founded in 1947) and Envision Credit Union (formed in 2001 through the merger of Delta Credit Union and First Heritage Savings Credit Union).

The organization also identifies predecessor institutions that later became operating divisions, including Enderby & District Credit Union, and Island Savings Credit Union (formed through earlier credit union mergers on Vancouver Island).

Historical accounts of East Chilliwack Credit Union describe its founding in 1954 and its later role in the merger history of credit unions in the Fraser Valley that contributed to the formation of First Heritage Savings Credit Union, one of the predecessor institutions to Envision Credit Union.

=== Formation of First West Credit Union (2010) ===
A period of consolidation among British Columbia credit unions led to the formation of larger regional entities in the early 21st century.

In 2010, Envision Credit Union and Valley First Credit Union merged to form First West Credit Union. Following the merger, Envision Credit Union's brand was updated to be Envision Financial. Both Envision Financial and Valley First retained their names as regional operating divisions.

In 2013, Enderby & District Credit Union joined First West Credit Union and retained an updated version of its name, Enderby & District Financial. In 2015, Island Savings Credit Union merged with First West Credit Union, joining Envision Financial, Valley First, and Enderby & District Financial as operating divisions under the First West group of brands.

=== Transition to federal regulation and Tru Cooperative Bank (2021-2026) ===
In 2021, members of First West Credit Union voted on a special resolution to apply to continue as a federal credit union under the Bank Act. This would enable the organization to operate under the Canadian federal regulatory body for financial institutions, the Office of the Superintendent of Financial Institutions (OSFI), while maintaining its cooperative structure. With OSFI's approval, First West Credit Union became a federally regulated credit union on April 1, 2026 and adopted the name Tru Cooperative Bank. Morningstar DBRS reported that the federal charter enabled the organization to serve members outside British Columbia and attract prospective members across Canada. Local coverage described the "Tru" name as intended to reflect the institution's cooperative roots.

== Business Operations ==
Tru Cooperative Bank’s core business is in retail banking, commercial and business banking, and wealth management.

- Retail banking - Provides consumer banking services through branches (advice centres), a Member Advice Centre, and digital banking channels.
- Commercial and business banking - Provides banking services to small and medium-sized enterprises, including commercial lending.
- Wealth management - Provides investment and advisory services, including offerings delivered in partnership with Aviso Wealth.

In 2026, Tru Cooperative Bank began providing mortgage lending services in Ontario through a partnership with MCAP, Canada’s largest independent mortgage finance company.

== Tru Cooperative Bank divisions ==
Tru Cooperative Bank operates in British Columbia through four regional brands, which function as local operating divisions under the same legal entity, and share a branch network while using distinct local operating names.

Tru Cooperative Bank operates in British Columbia in various municipalities through four regional brands:

- Envision Financial – Abbotsford, Chilliwack, Coquitlam, Delta, Hope, Kitimat, Langley, Maple Ridge, Mission, Surrey
- Valley First – Armstrong, Enderby, Kamloops, Kelowna, Keremeos, Lumby, Oliver, Penticton, Princeton, Vernon, West Kelowna
- Island Savings – Brentwood Bay, Chemainus, Duncan, Ladysmith, Lake Cowichan, Mill Bay, Nanaimo, Salt Spring Island, Victoria
- Enderby & District Financial - Enderby

== Cooperative Structure ==
Tru Cooperative Bank is a federal credit union, as defined in section 12.1 of Canada’s Bank Act. As such, it provides financial services primarily to its members and is democratically governed by them. The federal transition allows Tru Cooperative to operate in regions outside of British Columbia, expanding its services across British Columbia.

== Community involvement ==
Tru Cooperative Bank reports supporting community initiatives across British Columbia through charitable giving, employee volunteerism, its philanthropic foundation, and nonprofit partnerships. The 2024 and 2025 impact report describes four community focus areas: food insecurity, financial literacy, mental health, and employment readiness.

- Food insecurity - The organization reports operating food-security fundraising and donation initiatives under programs such as Feed the Valley and The Full Cupboard.
- Financial literacy - Tru Cooperative Bank partnered with ChatterHigh to deliver financial literacy programming for secondary schools in British Columbia.
- Mental health - The 2024 and 2025 impact report lists mental-health support as a community focus area and describes initiatives related to employee well-being and local partnerships.
- Employment readiness - The impact report describes employment readiness as a focus area and highlights partnerships and programs intended to support workplace skills development and job creation.

=== Tru Charitable Foundation ===
The Tru Charitable Foundation formerly, First West Foundation is a Canadian registered charitable foundation established in 1996. It is the cooperative banks philanthropic partner and administers grant-making programs and regional community endowments in areas served by Tru Cooperative Bank and its operating divisions. Its work is guided by the principles of trust‑based philanthropy, emphasizing reduced barriers to access, mutual accountability, and partnerships built upon mutual trust and respect with community partners.

The foundation aligns its granting with six United Nations Sustainable Development Goals, including poverty reduction, food security, health and well-being, education, equity and collaborative partnerships.

Local reporting on the Foundation grants has described funding directed to community organizations for capacity-building projects, including kitchen upgrades to expand meal programs. Media coverage has also highlighted the foundation's community-development leadership, including recognition of its executive director for long-term work related to food security and philanthropy.

=== Non-profit partnerships ===
==== Signature Cause - The Full Cupboard and Feed the Valley ====
Tru Cooperative Bank address food insecurity by supporting local food banks and working collaboratively to identify upstream solutions and opportunities to ensure the long-term sustainability of their community partners.

Through regular fundraising, partnerships with local BC food banks and ongoing community programs, they aim to consistently provide nutritious food to those in need. Their signature cause programs are Feed the Valley and The Full Cupboard, which aim to raid food, funds and awareness in helping local food banks combat food insecurity. Since 2010, these programs have raised more than $5.9 million and 223,400 lbs of food for those in need. Tru Cooperative Bank supports 31% of food banks in B.C., distributing food and grocery items to families, children, seniors and individuals at risk of hunger.

==== BC Cancer Foundation ====
Tru Cooperative Bank has partnered with the BC Cancer Foundation since 2022. The BC Cancer Foundation reports that Tru Cooperative Bank (at the time First West Credit Union) invested $300,000 in the Beyond Belief campaign between 2022 and 2024 and that an extension of the partnership included an additional $100,000 investment involving its regional brands. The initiative also involves engaging our team members, including the Workout to Conquer Cancer Challenge, and dedicated funds that go to advance research and innovative cares across the province.

==== ChatterHigh - Financial Literacy Module ====
Tru Cooperative Banks partnership with ChatterHigh is helping address the financial literacy gap by increasing access to financial literacy education online. ChatterHighs free, gamifies research and learning platforms enables individuals to build real-world financial skills through trusted resources, interactive quizzes and age-appropriate educational content.

== Other notable achievements ==
- In 2026, Tru Cooperative Bank was named an International Data Corporation (IDC) CIO Awards Canada winner for establishing a new model for collaborative innovation across the Canadian credit union sector. IDC describes the award as a recognized mark of enterprise excellence for winning organizations.
- Tru Cooperative Bank has been assigned an issuer rating by Morningstar DBRS. In a credit rating report, DBRS cited the organization's scale, cooperative ownership structure, and diversified regional operations in British Columbia.
- Tru Cooperative Bank received the Canadian Workplace Wellbeing Award presented by the Canadian Positive Psychology Association in 2024.
- Tru Cooperative Bank (at the time First West Credit Union) was named one of British Columbia's Top Employers in 2024, 2025, and 2026.
- In 2023, Tru Cooperative Bank (at the time First West Credit Union) was recognized as one of Canada's Most Admired Corporate Cultures by Waterstone Human Capital,
- In 2023, Tru Cooperative Bank and received the 5-Star Psychological Safety Award from the Canadian Positive Psychology Association.

== See also ==
- Envision Financial
- Valley First
- Island Savings
