= Launis =

Surname list

Launis is a surname. Notable people with the surname include:

- Armas Launis (1884–1959), Finnish composer
- Ilmari Launis (1881–1955), Finnish architect
- Mika Launis (born 1949), Finnish illustrator and graphic designer

== See also ==
- Launi
- Lauris (given name)
