= Assiniboine Credit Union =

Credit union in Manitoba, Canada

- Type: Credit union
- Industry: Financial services
- Founded: 1943
- Headquarters: Winnipeg, Manitoba, Canada
- Number of locations: 36
- Area served: Winnipeg and northern Manitoba, Canada
- Key people: Kevin Sitka (president & CEO); Crystal Laborero (chair)
- Revenue: ▲ C$426.87 million (2025)
- Net income: ▲ C$43.08 million (2025)
- Total assets: ▲ C$10.08 billion (2025)
- Members: 216,000 (2026)
- Number of employees: 500 (2018)
- Divisions: Outlook Financial
- Website: acu.ca

Assiniboine Credit Union (ACU) is a credit union based in Winnipeg, Manitoba. ACU has 36 branches in the province.

ACU was formed in 1943 by 15 employees of the Winnipeg Electric Company who got together to form the credit union. They named the new credit union after the street their company headquarters was on—Assiniboine Avenue.

ACU merged with Astra and Vantis credit unions in 2007 and with Caisse and Westoba in 2025.

== Branches ==
As of 2026, Assiniboine Credit Union has 36 branches.

As of 2020, ACU has two community economic development branches - in the West Broadway and North End neighborhoods of Winnipeg. These branches are deliberately placed in low-income areas in order to provide financial services to those ignored by the large commercial banks.

The North End location was opened in 2012, on McGregor Street at College Avenue. Camilla, Duchess of Cornwall toured the facility during her visit to Winnipeg to learn more about Manitoba Credit Unions.

== History ==
In 1943, under the backdrop of World War II and its impact on the world's economies, Ed McCaffrey and 8 co-workers from the Winnipeg Electric Company formed Assiniboine Credit Union, naming it after the street its headquarters was on—Assiniboine Avenue. Many Manitobans at the time were subjected to high interest rates charged by money lenders. McCaffrey and his colleagues thereby established ACU as an open bond credit union that welcomed everyone in the community to join.

In 2020, Assiniboine Credit Union received its B Corporation certification, after received an assessment score of 166.4, the highest in Canada and 6th highest in the world among over 3,500 certified B Corps.

=== Mergers ===
Mergers have been a large part of the history and success of credit unions over the years. ACU's history of mergers began in 1948, when Winnipeg Postal District Employees and Federal Employees of Manitoba merged with Keystone Credit Union, which ultimately merged with Assiniboine Credit Union in 1979.

On 24 June 2021, Assiniboine Credit Union signed a formal agreement to merge with Entegra Credit Union, followed by a public announcement 5 days later. Formally taking effect on 1 January 2022, the new entity will retain the Assiniboine Credit Union name; likewise, the current President and CEO of ACU, Kevin Sitka, will head the new credit union, while the CEO of Entegra, Brent Turman, will become Chief Operations and Strategic Initiatives Officer.

Date	Credit union merger	Later merger
1938	The Pool Credit Union Society Ltd.	Hy-Line 2001
1938	St. Alphonsus Credit Union Society Ltd.	Assiniboine 1982
1939	Burns Employees Credit Union	Assiniboine 1998
1943	Assiniboine Credit Union Society Ltd.	
1943	La Caisse Populaire de St-Norbert	Hy-Line 1989
1944	Airline Credit Union Society Ltd.	Assiniboine 1983
1946	Winnipeg Postal District Employees Credit Union Society Ltd.	Keystone 1948
1947	Federal Employees of Manitoba Credit Union Society Ltd.	Keystone 1948
1947	Keystone Credit Union	Assiniboine 1979
1948	Manitoba Power Commission (MPC) Credit Union Society Ltd.	
1948*	Winnipeg Postal District Employees and Federal Employees of Manitoba	merge with Keystone
1949	Aircrafters Credit Union Society Ltd.	Airline 1981
1949	Buffalo Credit Union Society Ltd.	Assiniboine 2008
1949	Decibel Credit Union Society Ltd.	Hy-Line 2002
1951	Fort Rouge Railway Employees Credit Union Society Ltd.	Hy-Line 1989
1951	Public Press Employees Credit Union Society Ltd.	Astra 1991
1952	Ogilvie's Employees Credit Union Society Ltd.	Assiniboine 1982
1957	Manitoba Sugar Employees Credit Union Society Ltd.	Hy-Line 1989
1958	Astra Credit Union Society Ltd.	Assiniboine 2007
1960	A.F & D.C. Credit Union Society Ltd.	Assiniboine 1978
1962	Continental Can Employees Credit Union Society Ltd.	Assiniboine 1982
1962	Hy-Line Credit Union Society Ltd.	Vantis 2002
1962*	MPC Credit Union merges with Hy-Line Credit Union	
1964	Hansa Credit Union Society Ltd.	Assiniboine 1991
1964	St. James Community Credit Union Society Ltd.	Astra 1969
1966	Pinawa Credit Union Credit Union Society Ltd.	Keystone 1975
1969*	St. James Community merges with Astra	
1975*	Pinawa merges with Keystone	
1978*	A.F. & D.C. merge with Assiniboine	
1979*	Keystone merges with Assiniboine	
1980	The Professional Financial Savings Credit Union Ltd.	Assiniboine 1988
1981*	Aircrafters merges with Airline	
1982*	St. Alphonsus, Continental Can and Ogilvie merges with Assiniboine	
1983*	Airline merges with Assiniboine	
1988*	Professional Financial Savings merges with Assiniboine	
1989*	Fort Rouge Railway, Manitoba Sugar and La Caisse populaire de St-Norbert merge with Hy-Line	
1991*	Hansa merges with Assiniboine	
1991	Public Press merges with Astra	
1998*	Burns merges with Assiniboine	
2001*	The Pool merges with Hy-Line	
2002*	Hy-Line and Decibel merge to create Vantis Credit Union	
2007*	Vantis and Astra merge with Assiniboine	
2008*	Buffalo merges with Assiniboine	

Note: an asterisk following the date indicates mergers

Dates of subsequent mergers and merge partners are in brackets.

Source: Credit Union Central of Manitoba, August 2013

== See also ==
- Access Credit Union
- Cambrian Credit Union
- Credit unions in Canada
- Steinbach Credit Union
