= Cambrian Credit Union =

Canadian credit union

- Formerly: Co-operators Credit Union
- Type: Credit union
- Industry: Financial services
- Founded: 1959
- Headquarters: Winnipeg, Manitoba, Canada
- Number of locations: 11 (2023)
- Area served: Winnipeg and Selkirk, Manitoba, Canada
- Key people: Deanne Magnus (president and CEO); Judy Mathieson (chair)
- Total assets: C$4.80 billion (2023)
- Members: 69,621 (2023)
- Divisions: Achieva Financial
- Website: cambrian.mb.ca

Cambrian Credit Union is a Canadian credit union in Manitoba. As of 2023, it had 69,621 members and C$4.80 billion in assets. It had 11 locations as of 2023, in Winnipeg and Selkirk.

Founded in 1959 as Co-operators Credit Union, the credit union was originally a closed-bond institution that restricted its membership to members of Red River Co-op. It merged with the Selkirk District Credit Union in 1970 and absorbed Heritage Credit Union (formerly Holy Cross Credit Union) in 1988. As of 1989, Cambrian Credit Union was an amalgam of twenty-six different credit unions. Rolling Mills Credit Union is also a predecessor of Cambrian's.

== See also ==
- Access Credit Union
- Assiniboine Credit Union
- Steinbach Credit Union
