= Village Historique Acadien Provincial Park =

Historical reconstruction in New Brunswick, Canada

Coordinates: 47.78844°N 65.09788°W

- Location: Bertrand near Caraquet, in northeastern New Brunswick, Canada
- Type: historical park
- Website: www.villagehistoriqueacadien.com

Village Historique Acadien Provincial Park is an historical reconstruction that portrays the way of life of Acadians between 1770 and 1949. It is located in Bertrand, in northeastern New Brunswick, 50 kilometres (31 mi) east of Bathurst and 130 kilometres (81 mi) north of Miramichi.

More than 40 buildings are staffed by interpreters in period costume. The Hôtel Château Albert is a replica of a hotel that once existed in Caraquet. The original was destroyed by fire in 1955 but it was rebuilt.

== History ==
The idea of the village came about in 1965, with a feasibility study conducted in 1969.

The village opened to visitors in 1977.

== Recognition ==
It was a Phoenix Award Winner from the Society of American Travel Writers (1996) and Attractions Canada (2001/2002)

== Gallery ==
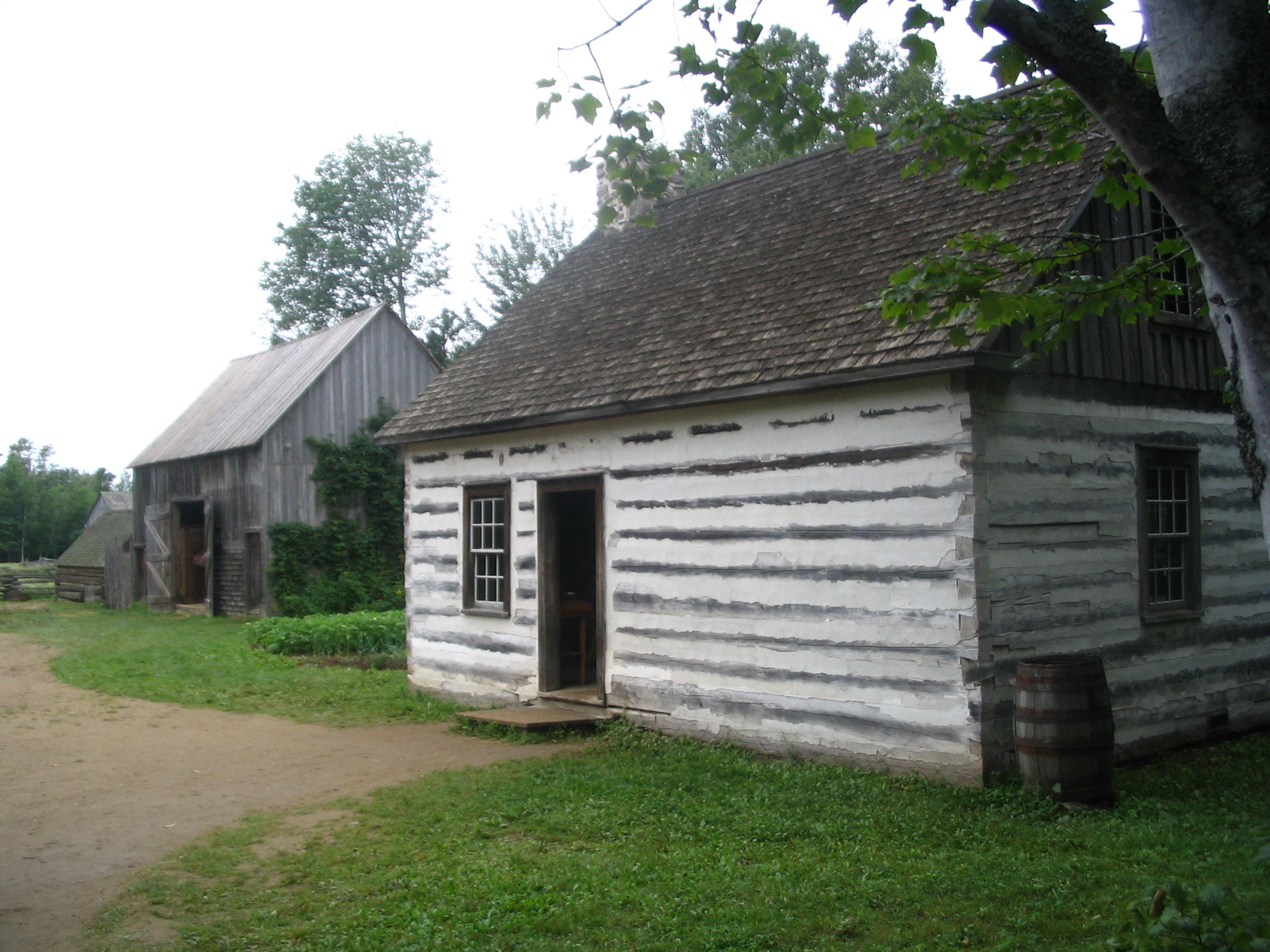
Mazerolle farm.

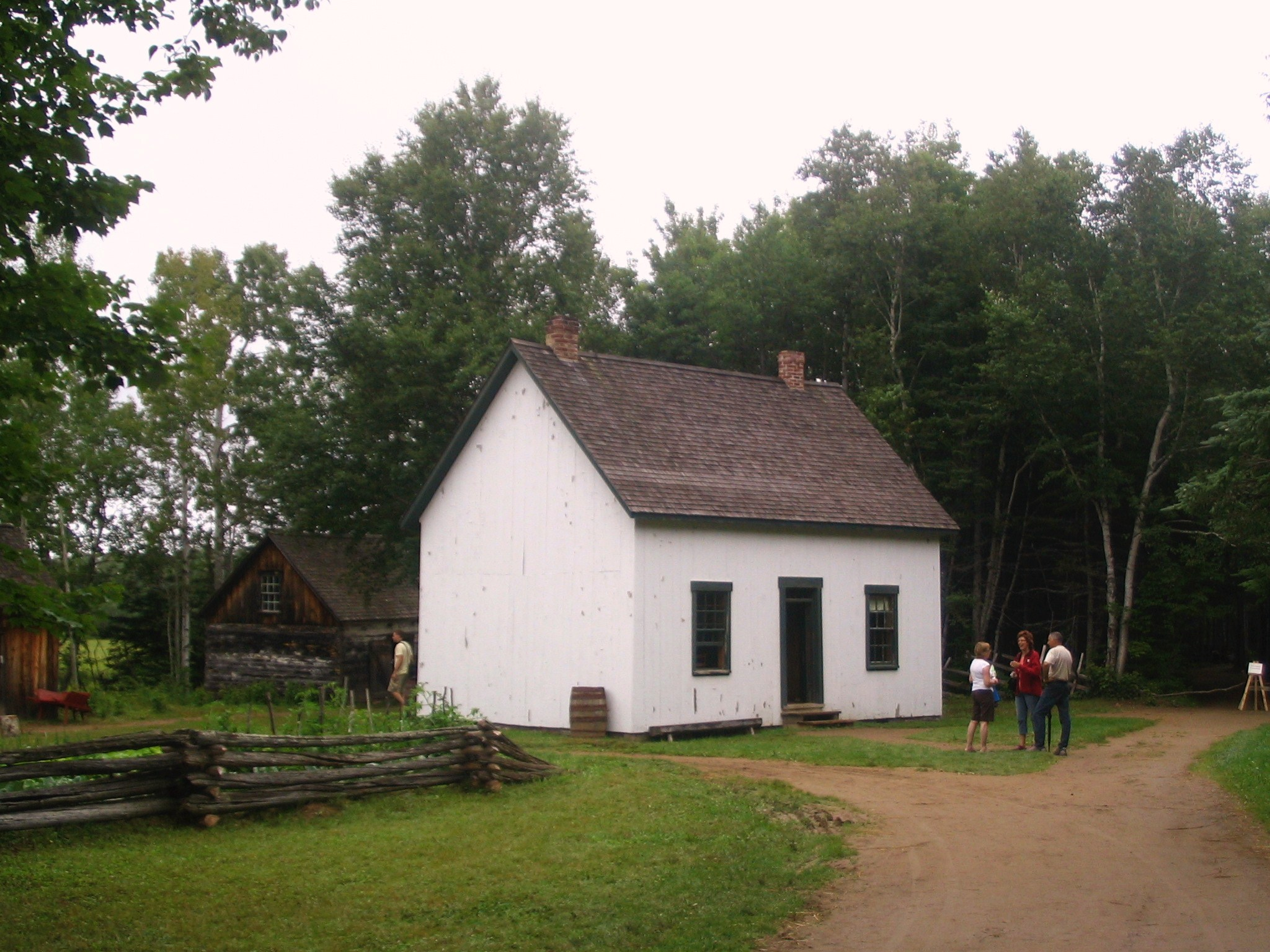
Godin house.

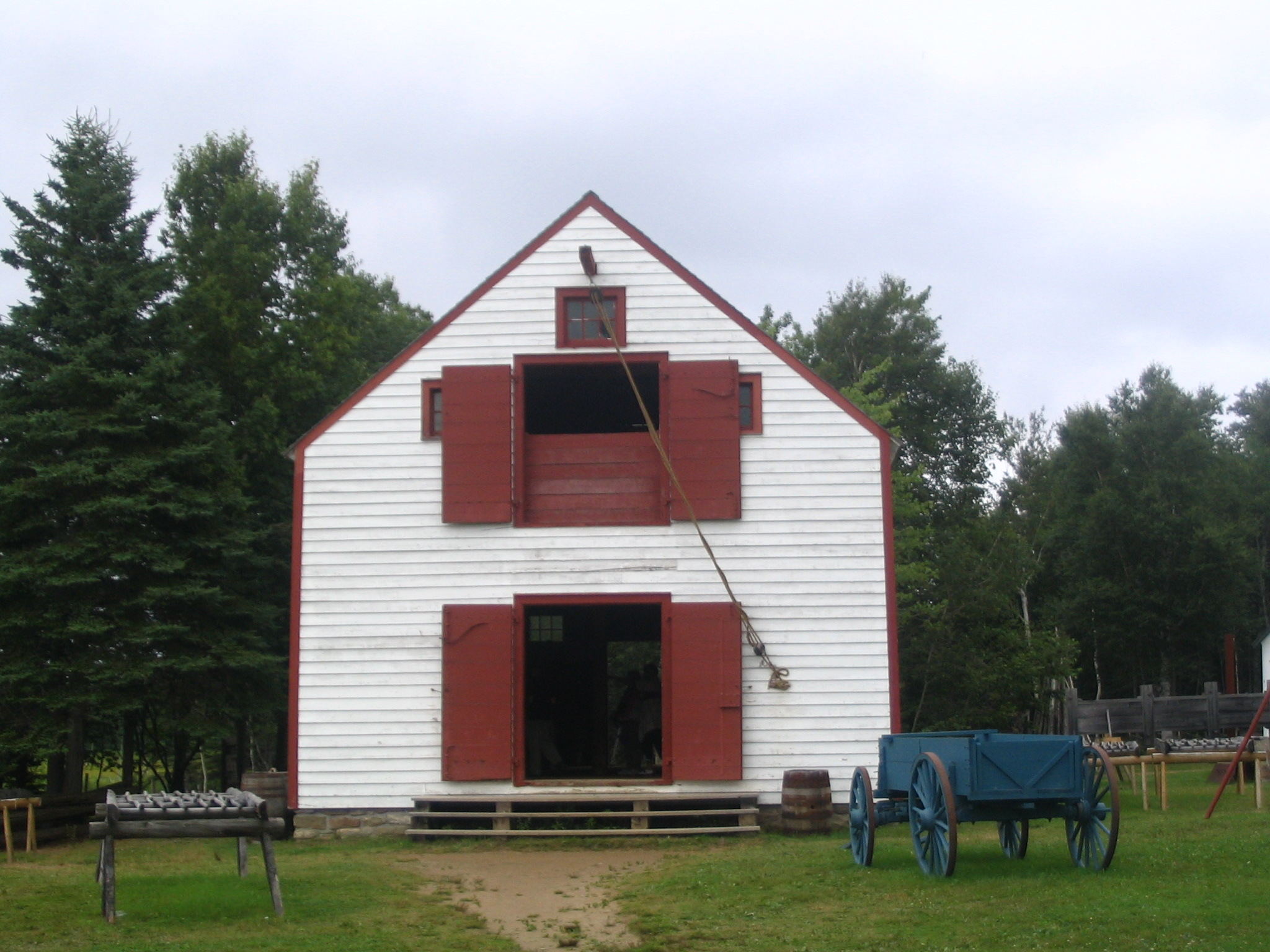
Robin warehouse.

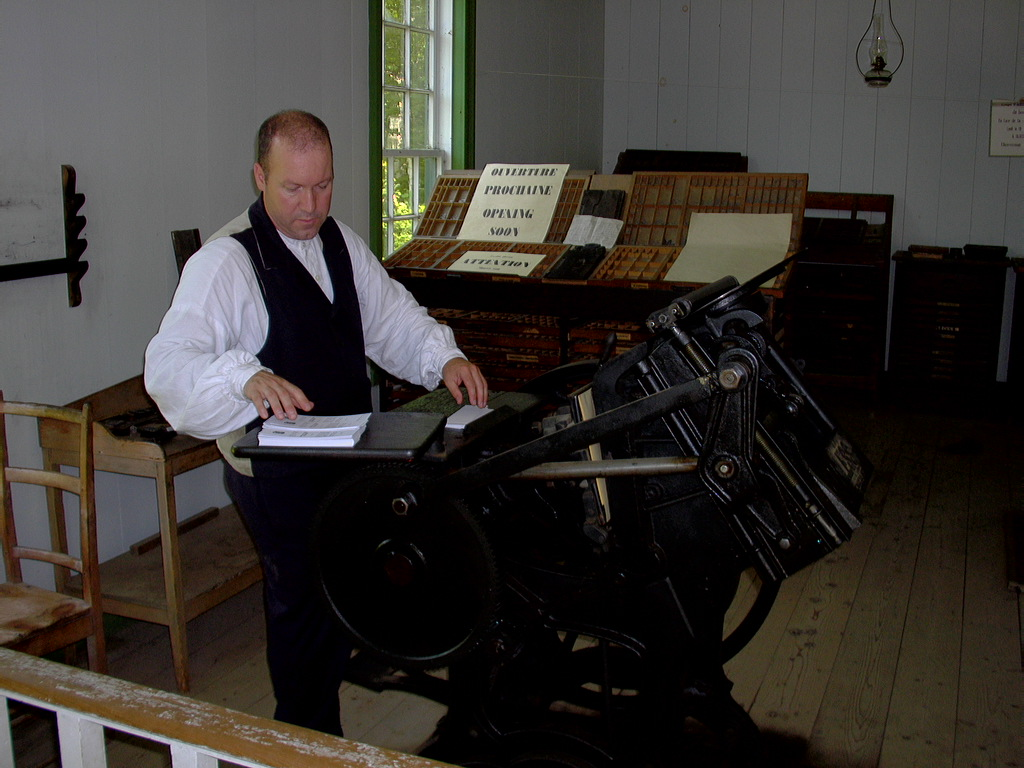
Printing house.

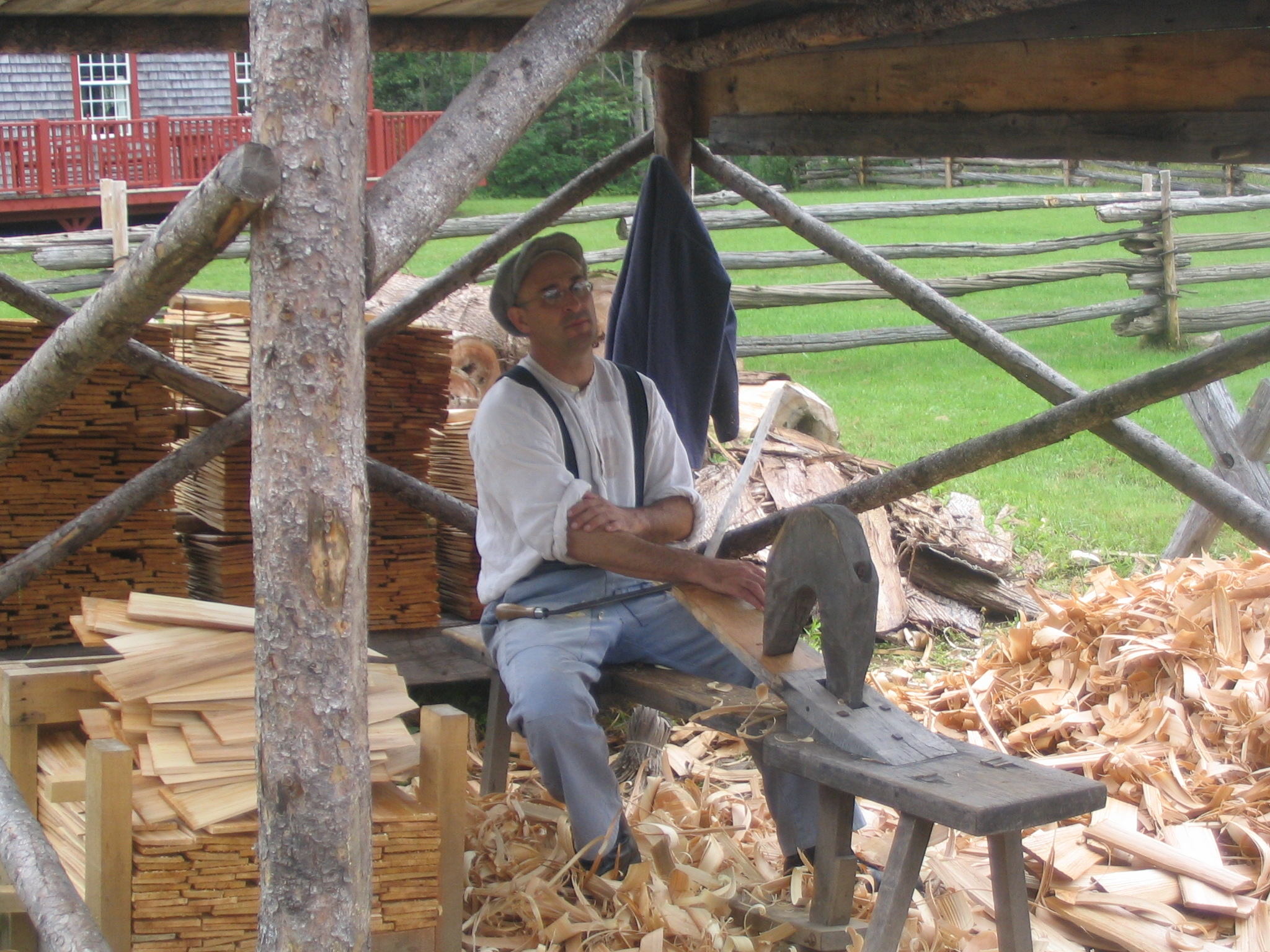
Shingles maker.

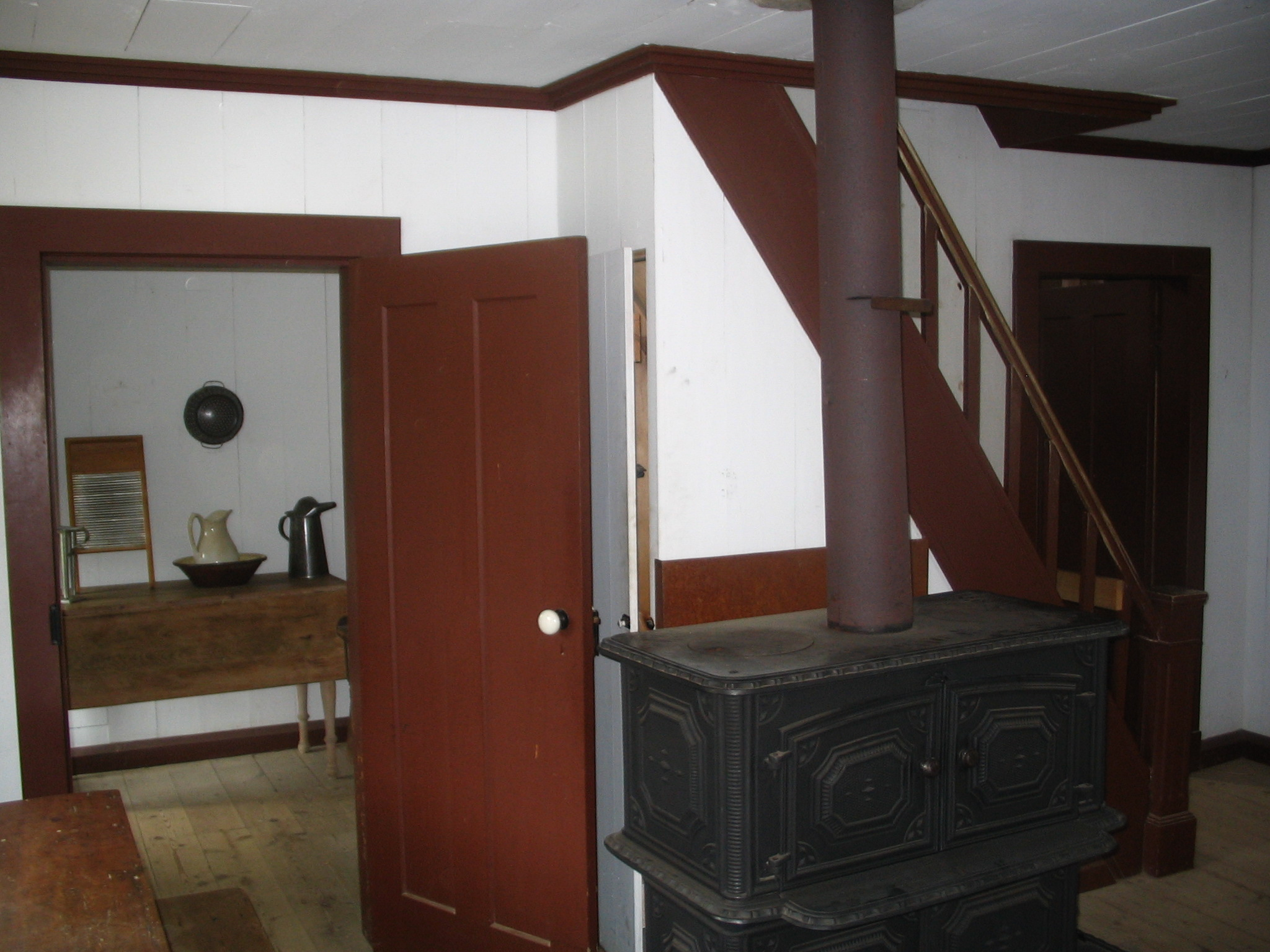
Inside Thériault house.

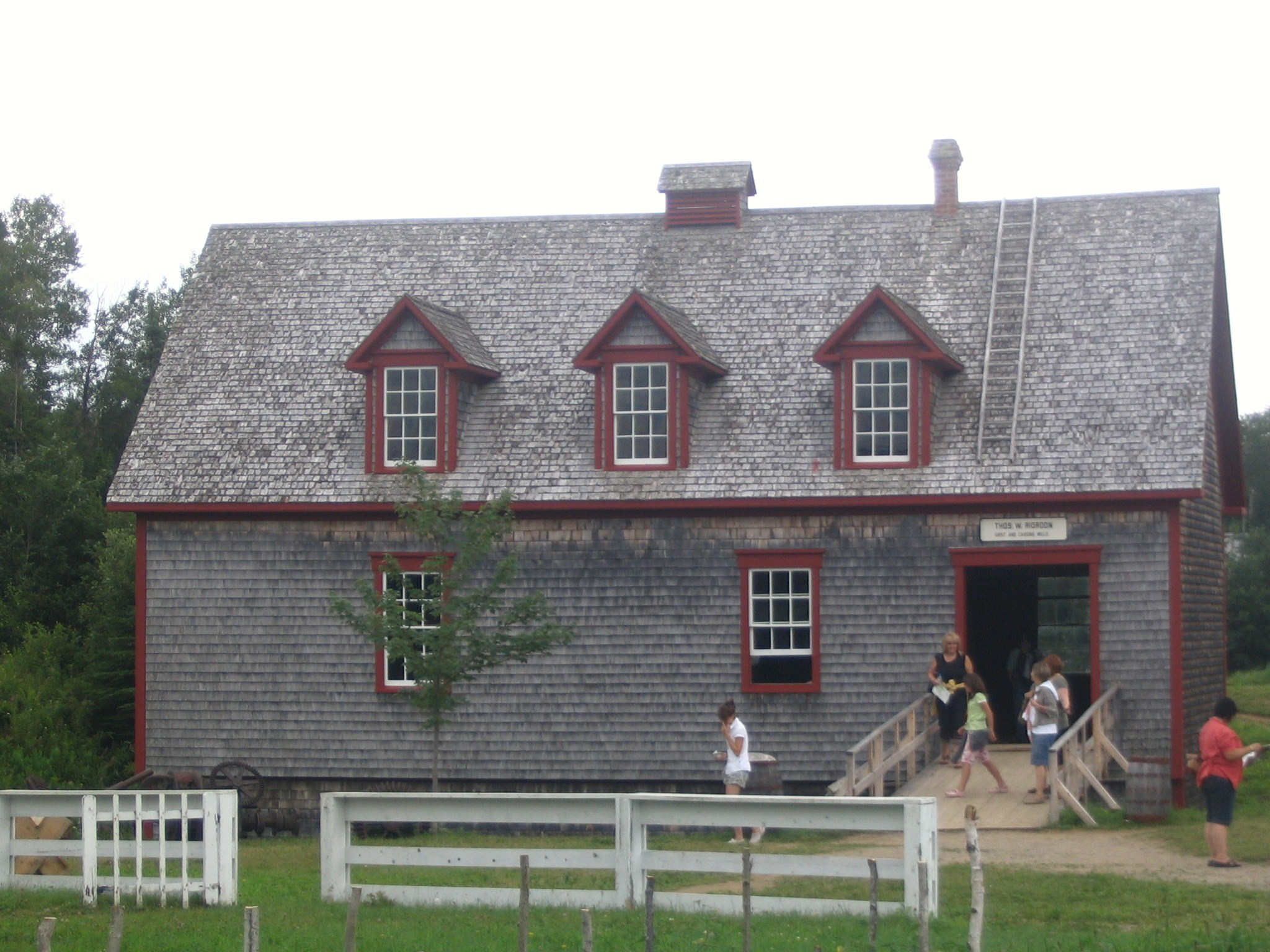
Riordon mill.

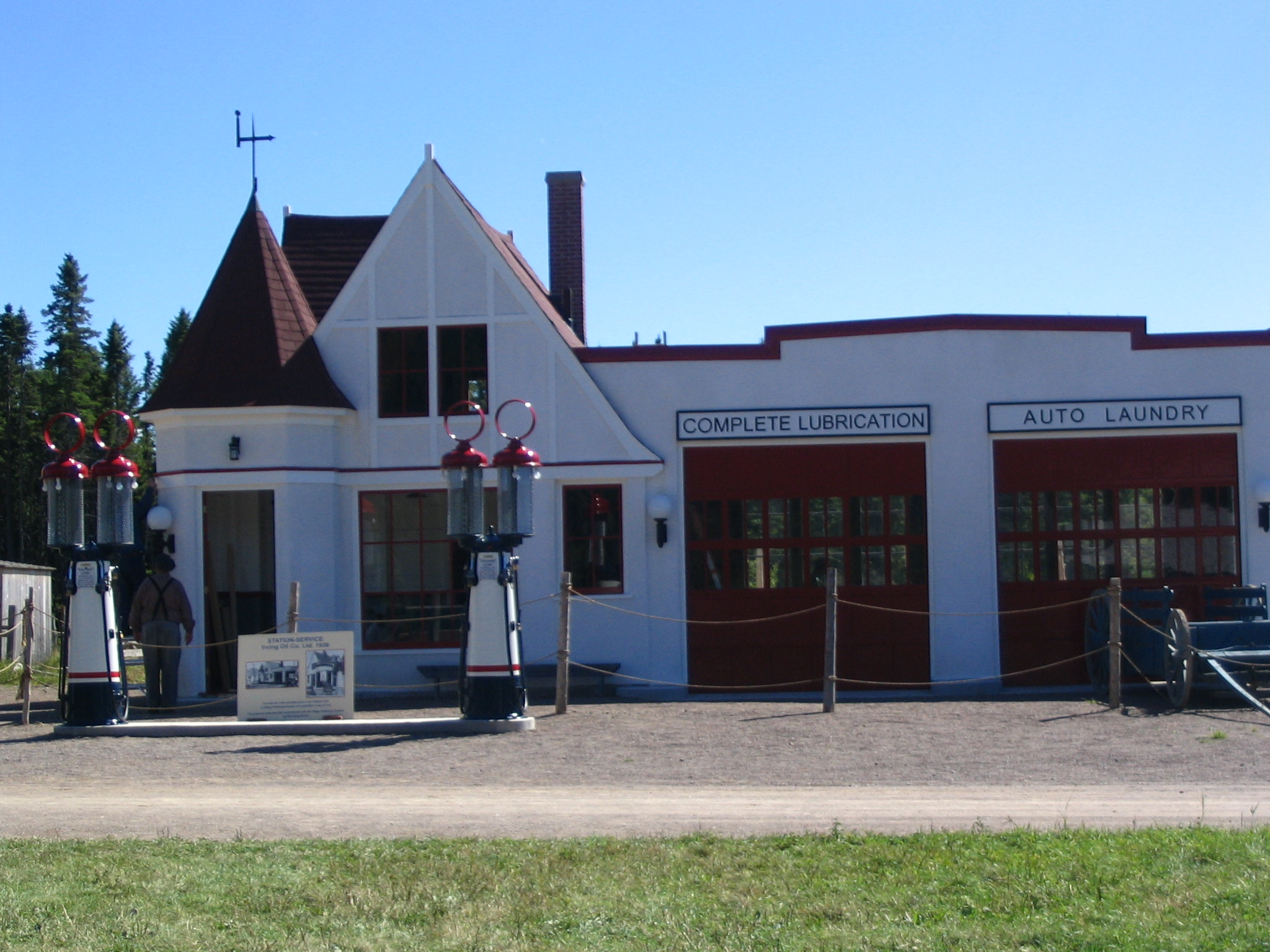
Irving gas station.

== Affiliations ==
The Museum is affiliated with: CMA, CHIN, and Virtual Museum of Canada.
