= Libro Credit Union =

Credit union in Canada

Libro Credit Union Limited
- Type: Credit Union
- Industry: Financial services
- Founded: 1951
- Headquarters: 217 York Street; London, Ontario; N6A 5P9
- Key people: Shawn Good president & CEO; Stephen Bolton former president & Former CEO; Jack Smit former president & CEO
- Revenue: ▲C$132.61 million (2021)
- Net income: ▲C$13.32 million (2021)
- AUM: ▲C$6.80 billion (2021)
- Total assets: ▲C$5.39 billion (2021)
- Number of employees: 700
- Website: www.libro.ca

Libro Credit Union, Libro, or Libro Credit Union Limited, is a credit union based in London, Ontario, Canada. Libro is owned by its customers, who direct the institution's decisions. Libro offers many financial services, including chequing and savings accounts, loans, mortgages, investments, financial coaching and advice for consumers and farm and business owners. Deposits are insured by the Financial Services Regulatory Authority of Ontario (FSRA).

Libro was founded in 1951 by the Dutch Catholic immigrants in the Diocese of London, who sponsored Theodore J. Smeenk to immigrate to London and seconded him to establish it. In 1953 the name was changed to St. Willibrord Community Credit Union and to Libro Financial Group in 2006. The credit union has grown and expanded across Southwestern Ontario through mergers with other credit unions in London, Blenheim, Kitchener-Waterloo, St. Thomas and Wingham.

Libro has over 103,000 members and $4.2 billion in assets under administration.{December 2017} There are 660 employees at 31 branches across southwestern Ontario and at the administration office in London, Ontario. Jack Smit was president and CEO from 1988 to 2012. He was also the chair of the Central 1 board of directors. Jack announced in August 2011 that he would retire on January 31, 2012. Stephen Bolton accepted the position of president and CEO, head coach on February 1, 2012.

As of February 13, 2023, Libro Credit Union announced the appointment of Shawn Good as President, Chief Executive Officer and Head Coach, effective May 1, 2023.

On June 4, 2010, Libro launched Young & Free Ontario with United Communities Credit Union.

In June 2013 Libro and United Communities Credit Union announced their intent to combine operations. On January 1, 2014, the two credit unions amalgamated. On January 1, the Kellogg Employee Credit Union announced that it would join Libro as of March 31, following the closure of the Kellogg cereal plant in London. In 2015 Hald-Nor Credit Union joined Libro with four branches in Haldimand and Norfolk counties.

On September 22, 2026, Libro announced they had signed a memorandum of understanding to explore a proposed merger with Tru Cooperative Bank.
