= Qtrade =

Canadian electronic trading platform

Credential Qtrade Securities Inc.
- Industry: Financial services
- Headquarters: Vancouver, British Columbia
- Area served: Canada
- Products: Electronic trading platform, robo-advisor
- Owner: Aviso Wealth
- Website: qtrade.ca

Credential Qtrade Securities Inc., operating as Qtrade (/ˈkjuːˌtreɪd/ KYOO-trayd), is a stockbrokerage firm based in Vancouver, Canada. It runs the online investment platform Qtrade Direct Investing and robo-advising service Qtrade Guided Portfolios. As of November 2016, it claimed to have $11.5 billion in assets and partnerships with over 150 Canadian credit unions, as well as insurance companies including Sun Life and Great West Life. Like all brokerages and investment dealers, they are members of Investment Industry Regulatory Organization of Canada (IIROC) and as such, the Canadian Investor Protection Fund (CIPF) protects investors should the brokerage become insolvent.

== History ==
Credential Qtrade Securities was formed from the amalgamation of Credential Securities Inc. and Qtrade Securities Inc., after their respective parent companies merged with NEI Investments to form Aviso Wealth. It has been in operation since 2001, and William Packham became the CEO of the company in May 2016.

== Products ==
=== Qtrade Direct Investing ===
Qtrade Direct Investing is an online discount brokerage that offers stocks, bonds, options, GICs and new issues. Like most brokerages, it also has a collection of commission-free exchange-traded funds and mutual funds. Registered RRSP and TFSA accounts are available, in addition to cash and margin accounts. Both Canadian and United States dollars can be held in its accounts.

The Globe and Mail ranked it first (out of Canadian online brokerages) in its online broker ratings 2016. Moneysense magazine ranked Qtrade highly in providing market intelligence category, but ranked other brokerages as superior for ease of use, record keeping and banking integration.
