= Access Credit Union =

Canadian financial institution

- Company type: Credit Union
- Industry: Financial services
- Founded: 1940; 86 years ago Winkler, Manitoba
- Headquarters: Winnipeg, Canada
- Number of locations: 52
- Key people: Larry Davey, President and CEO
- Products: Savings; checking; consumer loans; mortgages; credit cards; online banking
- AUM: CA$10.76 billion (2022)
- Members: 169,700
- Number of employees: 796
- Website: www.accesscu.ca

Access Credit Union is a Canadian credit union, formed by multiple mergers of smaller southern Manitoba credit unions, which provides full daily banking services, loans and mortgages, investment services and business banking. At the close of 2022, Access had CA$10.76 billion in assets and approximately 169,700 members. It has 52 branches across Manitoba. Access is the largest credit union in Manitoba and the sixth in Canada, excluding Quebec.

== History ==
Altona Credit Union was organized in 1939, Dufferin Credit Union was formed in 1961, Heartland Credit Union opened its doors for business in 2002 as a result of successful amalgamation with Gretna Credit Union (1943), Plum Coulee Credit Union (1942) and Winkler Credit Union (1940). In 1947, Morden Credit Union was formed eventually amalgamating with Manitou Credit Union and Miami Credit Union. In 2001, Valley Credit Union – formerly Morris CU (1947) and Dominion City CU (1946) amalgamated with Morden CU to form Agassiz Credit Union. Altona Credit Union, Dufferin Credit Union, Heartland Credit Union and Agassiz Credit Union merged in 2009 to form Access Credit Union. Lowe Farm Credit Union (1938) joined in 2010. Community Credit Union and Sanford Credit Union followed in 2013. Access merged with Winnipeg's Crosstown Civic Credit Union in 2021.

Access Credit Union also operates a wholly owned subsidiary in Credential Financial Strategies and is part owner in an insurance subsidiary.

On January 27, 2022, the members of Access Credit Union, Noventis Credit Union and Sunova Credit Union voted to merge. The merger took place legally on July 1, 2022. In 2022, the Casera and Carpathia Credit Unions voted to merge with Access Credit Union. Following these recent merges, Access Credit Union now is the largest credit union in Manitoba by assets.

== Memberships ==
- Central 1 Credit Union
- Interac
- The Exchange
- MasterCard
- Cirrus Network
- Maestro (debit card)
- Deposit Guarantee Corporation of Manitoba
- Co-op Network

== See also ==
- Assiniboine Credit Union
- Cambrian Credit Union
- Steinbach Credit Union
