= Envision Financial =

Division of Tru Cooperative Bank

- Industry: Financial services
- Founded: Delta Credit Union: 1946; First Heritage Savings: 1954; Merged as Envision Financial 2001; Valley First Credit Union (1947) and Envision Financial merged as First West Credit Union (2010) which was renamed Tru Cooperative Bank (2026)
- Headquarters: Langley, British Columbia, Canada
- Key people: Tamara Hendsbee, President
- Parent: Tru Cooperative Bank
- Website: www.envisionfinancial.ca
- Footnotes; Institution number: 809 (Tru Cooperative Bank)

Envision Financial, is a regional financial services brand operating in British Columbia, Canada. It is a division of Tru Cooperative Bank (formerly First West Credit Union), a federally-regulated, member owned financial institution.

The brand serves communities in the Lower Mainland, Fraser Valley, and Kitimat, offering personal and business banking, lending, and wealth management services. Envision Financial was established in 2001 through the merger of Delta Credit Union and First Heritage Savings Credit Union, and later merged with Valley First Credit Union to create First West Credit Union in 2010. When the organization transitioned to federal regulation on April 1, 2026, First West changed its name to Tru Cooperative Bank, with Envision Financial retained as a regional trade name.

Envision Financial's network consists of 19 branches throughout British Columbia in the communities of Abbotsford, Chilliwack, Delta, Hope, Kitimat, Langley, Mission, Surrey and Maple Ridge. Its regional administration centre is located in Langley.

== History ==
=== Early Origins ===
Envision Financial's origins date back to multiple credit unions in British Columbia communities including Delta Credit Union, which was founded in 1946 with its roots in the fishing industry, and First Heritage Savings Credit Union which was founded in 1954 with its roots in the agriculture industry. First Heritage Savings was created in 1983 when the East Chilliwack Credit Union (founded in 1954) merged with Abbotsford-based Clearbook District Mennonite Savings Credit Union. These institutions were established to provide cooperative financial services to local members.

=== Formation of First West Credit Union (2010) ===
In 2010, Envision Financial merged with Penticton-based Valley First Credit Union to form First West Credit Union. The newly formed organization adopted a multi-brand strategy, retaining Envision Financial and Valley First as a regional divisions each with their own leadership structure. First West Credit Union expanded through additional mergers with Enderby & District Credit Union in 2013 and Island Savings Credit Union in 2015. The institutions continued to operate as divisions of First West Credit Union under the brand names Enderby & District Financial and Island Savings respectively, alongside Envision Financial and Valley First.

=== Transition to Tru Cooperative Bank (2021–2026) ===
In 2021, members of First West Credit Union voted in favour of pursuing federal continuance, which would enable the organization to operate under the federal Bank Act while maintaining its cooperative ownership structure. Following regulatory approval and a subsequent member vote to change the organization's name, First West formally continued as Tru Cooperative Bank on April 1, 2026.

As part of this transition, the organization remained member-owned and continued its multi-brand approach. Envision Financial continues to be retained as a regional trade name rather than a separate legal entity.

== Relationship to Tru Cooperative Bank ==
Envision Financial operates as a trade name and regional division of Tru Cooperative Bank. It is not a separate legal entity, but part of a single federally regulated financial institution.

Tru Cooperative Bank operates under a multi-brand model that includes Envision Financial, Valley First, Island Savings, and Enderby & District Financial. This structure allows the organization to maintain local brand identities while sharing centralized governance, regulatory oversight, financial reporting and other administrative functions.

Deposits held under Envision Financial are insured by the Canada Deposit Insurance Corporation in accordance with federal regulations applicable to Tru Cooperative Bank.

== Operations ==
Envision Financial provides a range of financial services, including personal and business banking, commercial lending, residential mortgages, and wealth management services, delivered through a network of digital banking platforms, advisory services, and a branch network consisting of 19 locations throughout British Columbia in the communities of Abbotsford, Chilliwack, Delta, Hope, Kitimat, Langley, Mission, Surrey and Maple Ridge. Its regional administration centre is located in Langley. Through its parent organization Tru Cooperative Bank, the brand is part of one of Canada’s largest cooperative financial institutions.

== See also ==
First West Credit Union Valley First Island Savings
