= Historical park =

Historical park may refer to:

- Historical parks of Thailand
- National Historical Parks of the United States
