= Steinbach Credit Union =

Canadian credit union in Manitoba

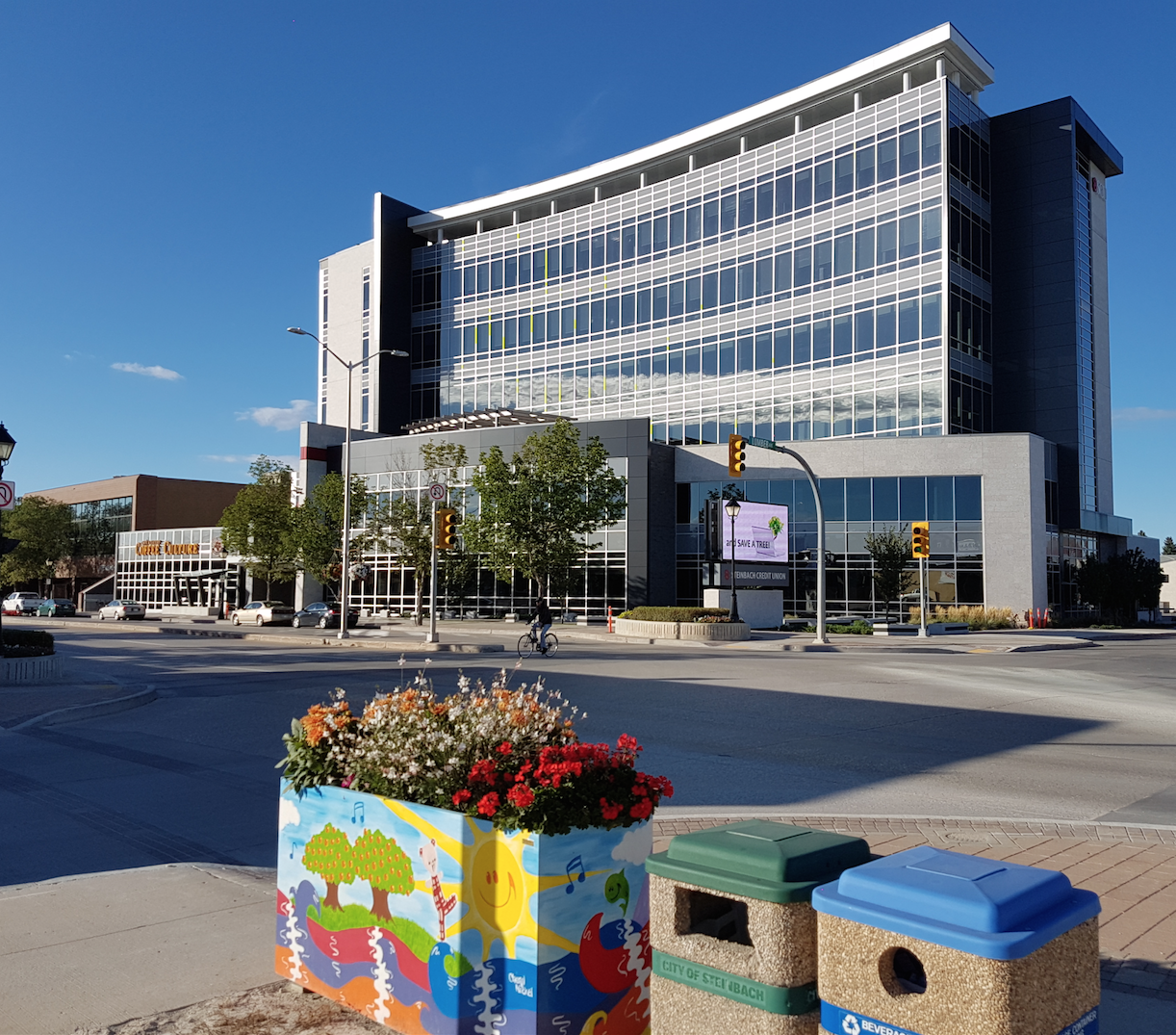
- Steinbach Credit Union headquarters
- Type: Credit union
- Founded: 1941
- Headquarters: Steinbach, Manitoba, Canada
- Number of locations: 3
- Products: Financial services
- Total assets: CA$10.3 billion (2024)
- Members: 113,000
- Website: www.scu.mb.ca

Steinbach Credit Union (SCU) is a Canadian financial institution with over 115,000 consumer, business, and agricultural members. With more than $11 billion in assets, SCU is among the largest credit unions in Manitoba, and in the top 10 in Canada. It was founded in Steinbach, Manitoba, in 1941.

== Locations ==
SCU has three branches in Manitoba, located in Steinbach and Winnipeg. SCU also has business lending centre (2445 Pembina Hwy), a member contact centre (St. Mary’s Rd.), and several stand-alone ATM locations in Steinbach and Winnipeg.

Year built	Common name	Address
2015	Steinbach Branch	333 Main Street, Steinbach, MB R5G 1B1
2003	Linden Ridge Branch	2100 McGillivray Blvd, Winnipeg, MB R3Y 1X2
2010	Lagimodiere Branch	1575 Lagimodiere Blvd, Winnipeg, MB R3W 0B9

== History ==
Steinbach Credit Union was formed in 1941. It grew to become the largest single branch credit union in Canada, until SCU opened its second branch in Winnipeg in 2003.

== See also ==
- Access Credit Union
- Assiniboine Credit Union
- Cambrian Credit Union
