= UNI Financial Cooperation =

Canadian credit union

Caisse populaire acadienne ltée

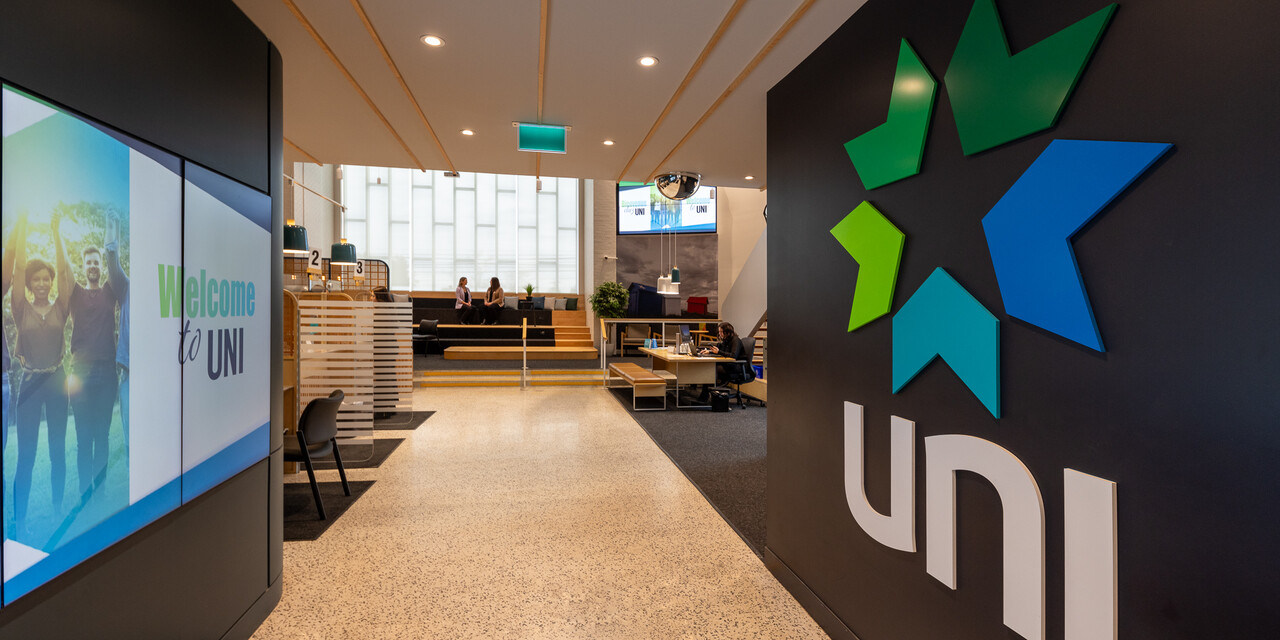
- Trade name: UNI Financial Cooperation
- Company type: Credit union
- Industry: Financial services
- Founded: December 3, 1946; 79 years ago
- Headquarters: Caraquet, New Brunswick, Canada
- Area served: Canada
- Key people: Éric St-Pierre(CEO)
- Total assets: CA$5.2 billion
- Members: 157,000
- Number of employees: 1,000
- Website: www.uni.ca/en/

Caisse populaire acadienne ltée, operating as UNI Financial Cooperation (French: UNI Coopération financière), is a Francophone credit union (French: caisse populaire) based in New Brunswick, Canada whose members are primarily Acadians. UNI's administrative headquarters are in Caraquet on the Acadian Peninsula.

The Fédération des caisses populaires acadiennes (the Fédération) was founded on December 3, 1946, shortly after the New Brunswick Credit Union League, created in 1938 as part of the popular Antigonish Movement, was divided into two separate entities. Factors that may have contributed to the Mouvement's success were the catastrophic economic situation during the Great Depression, the minority status of the Acadians, and the dedication of its proponents, who included Livain Chiasson and first president, Martin J. Légère.

In 2014, the Mouvement des caisses populaires acadiennes (the Mouvement), comprising the Fédération, its supporting institutions and subsidiaries, adopted a “collective bridging” (merger) project resolution. 91% of members were in favour when the change was put to a vote. The Fédération became a single administrative entity with the merger of its 15 individual credit unions (caisses), operating 51 business locations from its headquarters in Caraquet.

As of December 31, 2016, UNI Financial Cooperation had 155,000 members and CA$3.8 billion in assets. Community involvement focuses mainly on education and youth, the institution giving nearly $2.1 million in 2016 in the form of scholarships, donations and sponsorships. The current chair of the Board of Directors is Pierre-Marcel Desjardins. Camille H. Thériault became chief executive officer for the second time on August 16, 2023.

== History ==
=== Origins ===
Before World War I, Acadian economic activities were mainly traditional, such as fishing and farming. There were few companies, and finance was controlled by English speakers. The first farmers’ bank was founded in Prince Edward Island in 1859. Numerous other cooperatives followed, notably a fishers’ cooperative founded in 1915 in Chéticamp, Nova Scotia, which triggered the hostility of certain merchants. The first Francophone caisse populaire was founded in Richibouctou the same year, inspired by the Caisse Desjardins in Quebec. Along with another caisse founded in 1917, it was not as successful as hoped.

The precarious situation of the fishers’ cooperative led the federal government to launch a royal commission, the MacLean Commission, in 1927. The fishers proposed many solutions, and established their own study circles and associations. The recommendations in the commission report, published two years later, included setting up an adult education system and providing financial support for efforts to organize.

Already struggling in the post-war period, the Acadians were hard-hit by the Great Depression of 1929. Every sector of their economy was disrupted, and the effects of the crisis continued to be felt through 1941. The federal government finally responded to the royal commission's recommendations in 1930.

The Antigonish Movement, launched that same year by St. Francis Xavier University in Antigonish, Nova Scotia, was heavily influenced by the social theology movement of the 1920s. It prescribed rural reform through collective education involving various sectors of the economy, also acknowledging the important roles of the clergy and women. Study circles became very popular, and many publications were distributed at their meetings. Information was also circulated in media publications, including L’Évangéline, which presented cooperation as the only means of distributing wealth. Study circles among the Acadians in New Brunswick grew between 1936 and 1941, from 200 to 744 with 7,000 members. The most important figure in the Mouvement was Livain Chiasson. Agronomists also promoted cooperative principles at farmers’ circles and agricultural societies, and in 1935 called for legislation to be passed allowing the establishment of credit unions. According to Jean Daigle, the success of the cooperatives was due not only to the catastrophic economic circumstances and the dedication of their proponents but also to the minority status of the Acadians.

=== Early years ===
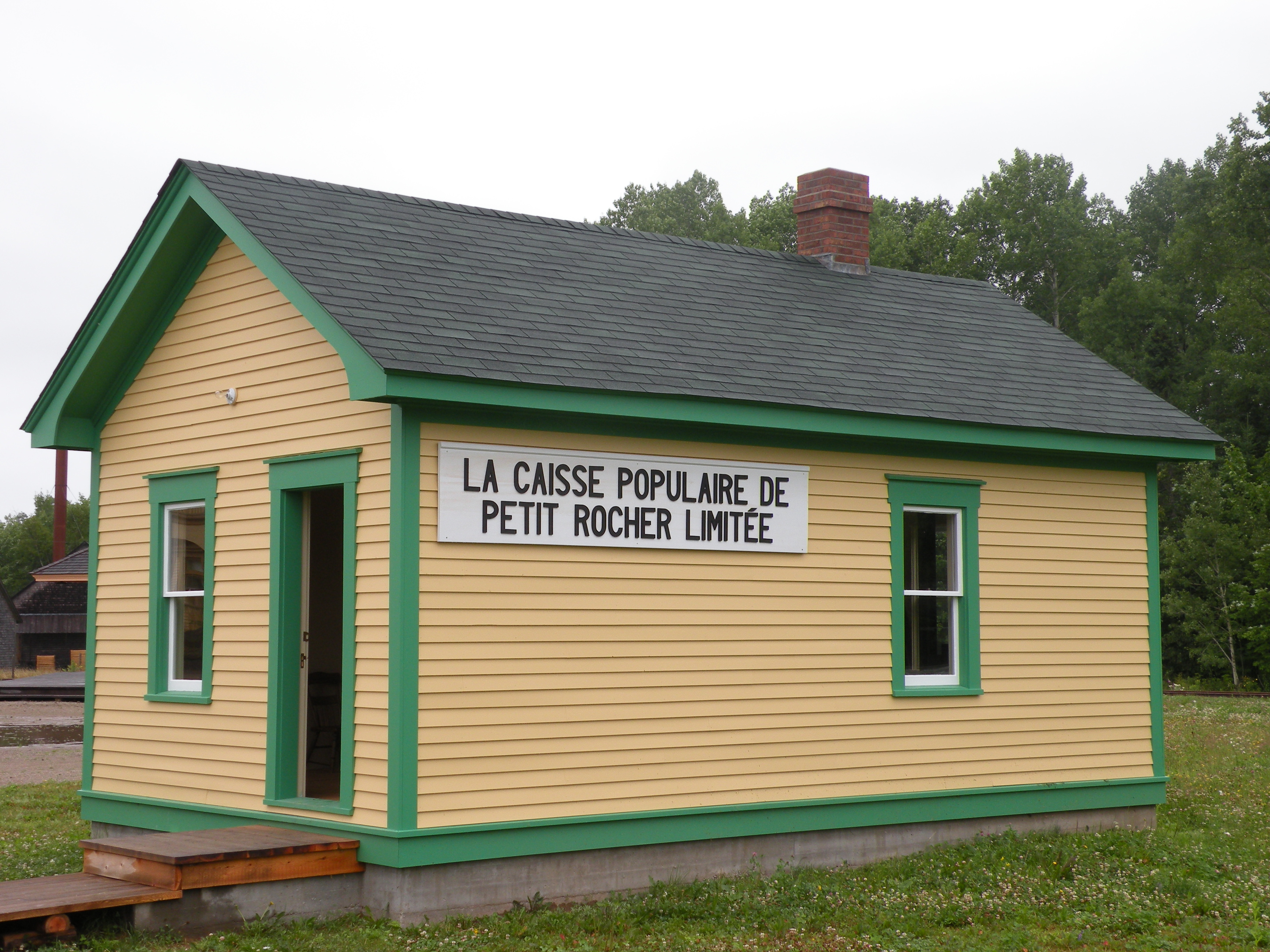
Replica of the Caisse populaire de Petit-Rocher at the Village historique acadien.

In 1936, the Credit Unions Act created a credit union division within the New Brunswick Department of Agriculture. The oldest caisse populaire still in existence was founded in Petit-Rocher in December of that year. Between 1936 and 1941, a total of 60 caisses populaires and 78 credit unions were established, the cooperative movement seeing greater success in New Brunswick than in Nova Scotia despite the origin of the Antigonish Movement in the latter province. The New Brunswick Credit Union League (the League), established in 1938, sought both to offer services, which included improved stewardship, bookkeeping, the purchase of equipment and arrangement of insurance coverage, and to promote cooperation and represent credit unions. The League wanted to bring together credit unions and caisses populaires across the province, and set up an education committee in 1941. Between 1941 and 1944, there were ongoing discussions concerning possible affiliation with the Credit Union National Association (CUNA) in the United States. Many members argued in favour because of the CUNA's loans and savings insurance cover, provided through CUNA Mutual and accessible to member credit unions for a premium. But the fact that meetings of the League were held primarily in English caused difficulty for the French-speaking Acadians, none of whom held major positions in that organization. In January 1945, a New Brunswick Credit Union meeting held at the Université du Sacré-Cœur in Bathurst decided to separate the League into two sections, one English-speaking and one French-Speaking. On July 2 of that year, the League's annual general meeting was boycotted by the Francophone section.

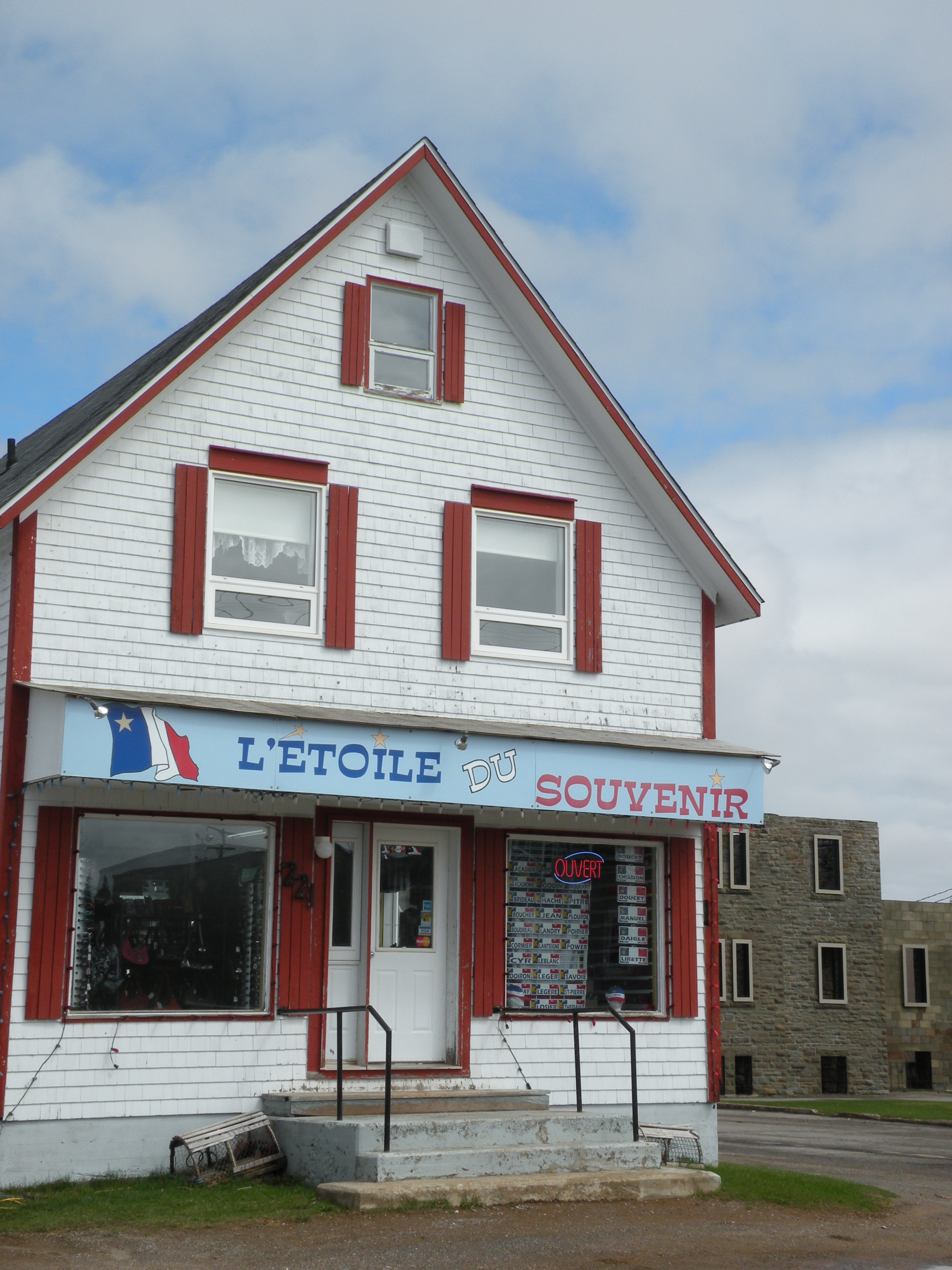
First headquarters in Caraquet.

The Fédération des caisses populaires acadiennes (the Fédération) was subsequently established at a meeting at the Université du Sacré-Cœur on July 31, 1945. Its charter was ratified on December 3, 1946, and signed by all 15 caisses populaires in existence at that time. A copy of the original charter, issued by the Department of Agriculture, hangs today at the headquarters of UNI Financial Cooperation. The main caisse opened its doors in Caraquet in 1947. Also that year, Martin J. Légère became the first president, holding that position until 1981. In 1948, at odds with paying fees to the CUNA, the Fédération successfully convinced the Legislative Assembly of New Brunswick to adopt an act recognizing the Société d’assurance des Caisses populaires acadiennes (SACPA), owned by the Fédération and other cooperatives. The SACPA's sole function at that time was to provide universal group coverage of member loans, savings, and shares in the caisses populaires.

=== Expansion ===
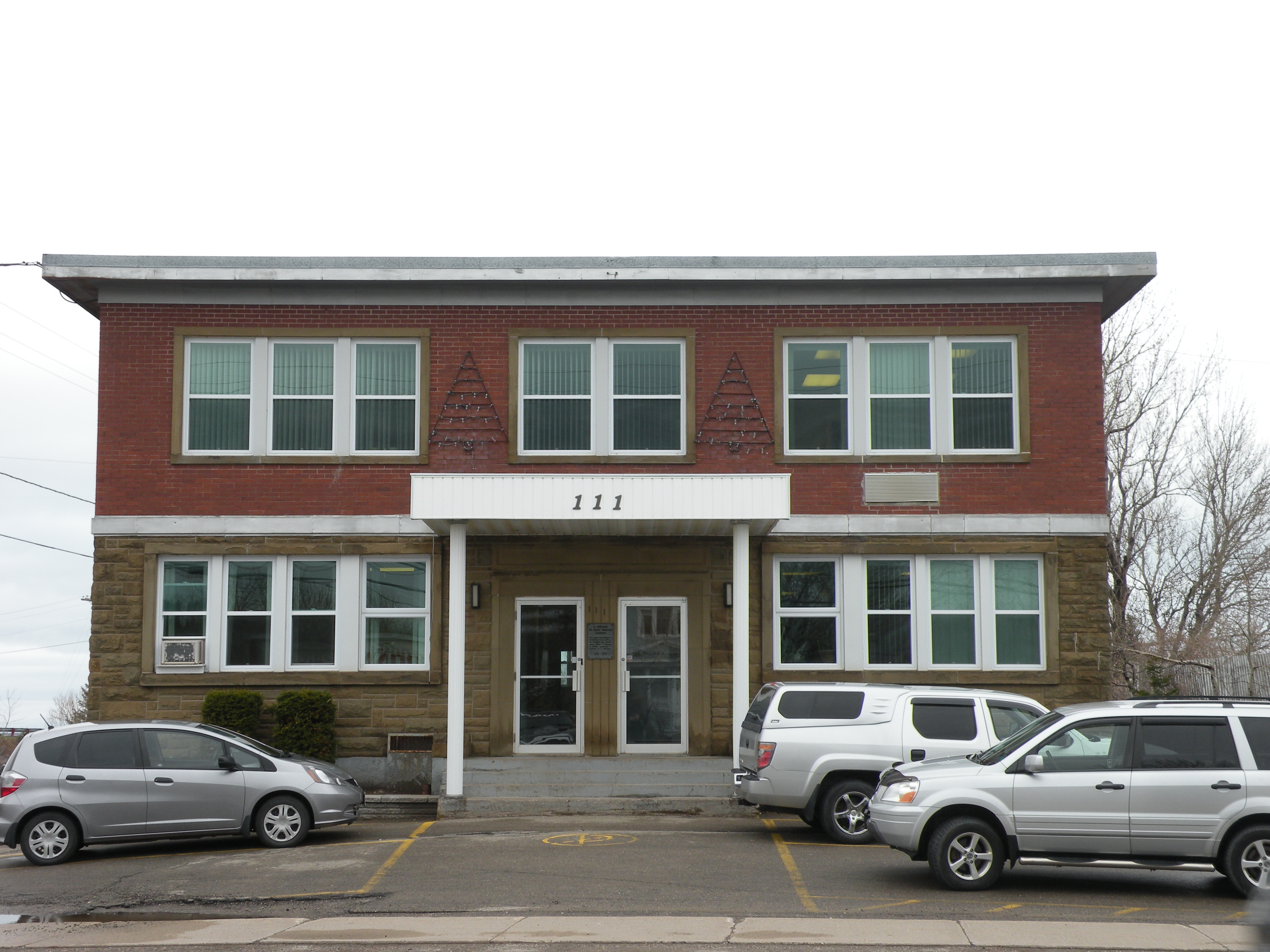
Second headquarters.

The Caisse populaire de Caraquet was the first to issue a cheque, in 1950. The Union coopérative acadienne was founded in 1955 (it later became the Conseil acadien de la coopération, in 1980). A new headquarters was inaugurated in Caraquet in 1955. Term deposits were first offered in 1965. The Fédération adopted its first logo in 1973.

Cooperation with Les Caisses Desjardins became closer, beginning in 1966 when the latter began assisting with staff training and accounting management was harmonized. The Services Unis de Vérification et d’Inspection were established in 1974. Cooperation subsequently intensified. An electronic caisse operation system (COS) was designed in 1976, and the caisse in Lamèque became the first to adopt this system the following year. The Caisses populaires acadiennes joined the Caisses Desjardins network, becoming associate members of Caisse centrale Desjardins in 1981. The Office de stabilisation de la Fédération des Caisses populaires acadiennes ltée was established in 1978. In 1986, the debit card La Populaire was introduced when the first automated teller machine (ATM) was installed in Edmundston and the Fédération joined the Interac network. Cooperation with the Mouvement Desjardins culminated in 1990 with the signing of a first affiliation agreement.

The Fédération continued to grow, with phase I of its current headquarters, Place de l’Acadie, opening its doors in 1978. The Institut de coopération acadien ltée was also founded that year. In 1980, the SACPA began offering life annuities. In 1982, it began selling personal life insurance products. The Fondation des Caisses populaires acadiennes was established in 1983. Management of the employee pension plan was taken over from Assumption Life in 1986. Phase II of Place de l’Acadie was inaugurated in 1989. Also that year, the Fédération des Caisses populaires became the first financial institution in the province to put in place a direct payment system based on use of bank cards. La Financière Acadie, which offered a range of complementary financial products, was formed in 1994. The New Brunswick Credit Union Deposit Insurance Corporation was established the same year.

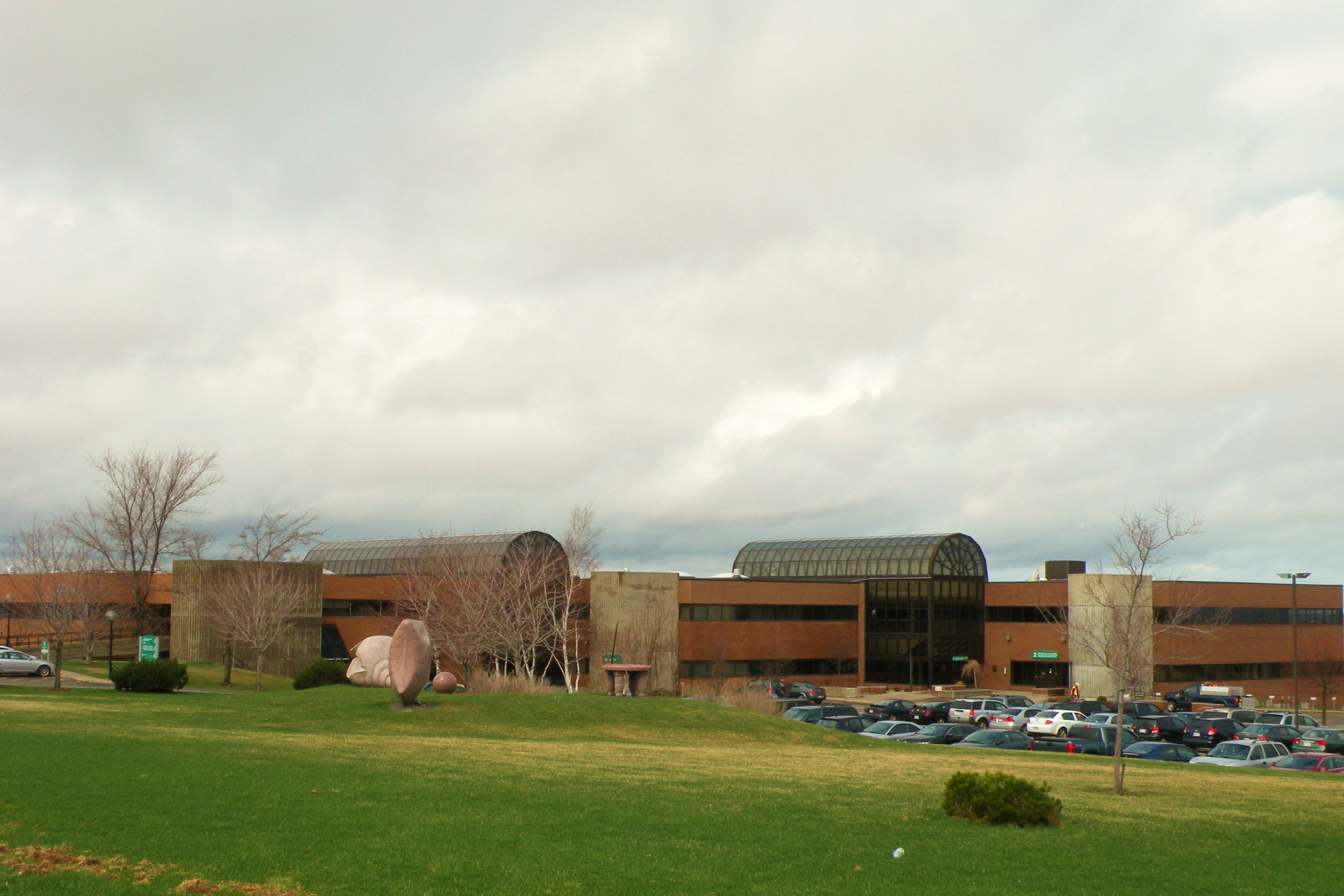
Édifice Martin-J.-Légère, formerly Place de l’Acadie, home of the institution's headquarters since 1978.

=== New structure ===
Globalization brought many foreign banks to invest in Canada during the 1990s, leading to a proposed merger of the Royal Bank and the Bank of Montreal in order to remain competitive. The new context, in association with other factors such as the development of new technologies and the primarily local focus of caisse populaire activities, prompted cooperatives such as the Mouvement des caisses populaires acadiennes to change their strategy.

Accordingly, in 1995 the current organizational structure was implemented, separating the Mouvement into a cooperative block and a new corporate block. The Société de services Acadie, the Acadia Service Centre and Acadia Financial Services were set up at this time, and the launch of the Fonds de placement Acadie created the first mutual fund managed in Acadia. Optional life insurance on loans became available in 1996. The same year, SACPA was rebaptized Acadia Life, and adopted the Fédération's logo. In addition, a new corporate image was adopted to mark the Fédération's 50th anniversary. Phase III of Place de l’Acadie was inaugurated in 1997. Also that year, Acadia Life diversified its disability insurance offerings. The official website, acadie.com, was launched in 1998 along with the portal, acadie.net. Placements Acadie was established in 1998. Acadia Life was demutualized in 1999, becoming a company with a single shareholder, the Fédération. Promenade Acadie, an online shopping website, was launched in 2000. The new corporate signature “Higher, further, together” was unveiled in 2004. Acadia General Insurance was founded in 2005, although it did not begin operating until two years later.

In 2006, Place de l’Acadie was renamed Édifice Martin-J.-Légère on the occasion of the 60th anniversary of the Fédération des Caisses populaires acadiennes. The Caisse populaire de Shippagan rejoined the Fédération in 2007. AVie was created in 2008. The first office of Acadia General Insurance also opened that year in Tracadie-Sheila. A replica of the first caisse populaire in Petit-Rocher was erected at the Village historique acadien in 2009. Mobile services were launched in 2010.

In 2012, Caisses populaires acadiennes was named a platinum partner of the Congrès mondial acadien 2014. The Financial Business Centre and the Centre administratif Acadie were also established.

=== Partnerships and new image ===
In 2013, a major three-year partnership was signed with the Fédération des jeunes francophones du Nouveau-Brunswick. Also in that year, the institution signed a historic agreement with the Université de Moncton, opening a service centre on the Moncton campus. In 2014, a business partnership with the Vitalité Health Network was announced.

On April 24, 2014, delegates in Edmundston voted on a proposal for a collective bridging project. On November 12, 2014, 91% of caisse members voted to proceed. In 2015, Desjardins and the Fédération des caisses populaires acadiennes renewed their business partnership. On January 1, 2016, the new merged caisse became accessible to all 155,000 members across the region through 51 business locations. Two new MasterCard credit cards were also issued, and a mobile deposit application with a photo cheque deposit option was launched.

In April 2016, the Caisse populaire acadienne ltée unveiled a new corporate image, adopted at its annual general meeting in Moncton. On May 30, 2016, to mark its 80th anniversary, the Caisse officially adopted this image, featuring a new operating name, UNI Financial Cooperation, and logo.

On July 1, 2016, UNI Financial Cooperation became the first federally chartered credit union. The Fédération des Caisses populaires acadiennes and the Office de stabilisation des caisses populaires acadiennes were dissolved at the same time. Édifice Martin-J-Légère was named the official headquarters of UNI Financial Cooperation. On January 1, 2017, Camille H. Thériault retired as chief executive officer and Robert Moreau stepped into his role.

Map of UNI Financial Cooperation branches in 2025. Green squares represent personal member service points and blue squares represent business member service points. The white square with the star represents the movement's head office in Caraquet.

=== Members, caisses and business locations ===
As at December 31, 2016, UNI Financial Cooperation had 155,000 members, with one caisse, 51 business locations, four UNI Business offices, and nearly 1,000 employees. According to a 1996 study by Léger Marketing, 70.3% of Francophones in New Brunswick did business with one or more caisses populaires acadiennes, with 61.3% dealing mainly with one caisse.^{11} The institution's main competitor at that time was National Bank, representing 12.7% of French speakers, followed by Royal Bank (5.6%), Bank of Montreal (5.3%), Caisse populaire de Shippagan (which later joined the Fédération) (5.0%), Scotiabank (3.7%), and other institutions (less than 2.0% each).

A number of caisses have merged over the years. The 2000s saw a 30% decrease in the number of clients requesting counter service and a 20% decrease in the number of members using ATMs. Over the same period, use of Internet-based services increased by 2200%.^{18} These trends led to the closure of some 20 business locations in 2012 and 2013.

Evolution of the number of caisses and business locations
	1997	1998	1999	2000	2001	2002	2003–2006	2007–2008	2009	2010	2011	2012	2013	2014–2015	2016
Number of caisses	85	77	66	56	46	35	33	34	31	25	22	15	15	15	1 entity under UNI Financial Cooperation
Number of business locations	88	88	88	86	85	85	85	86	86	84	82	80	62	51	51

Number of members
1970	1990	2011	2016*
100 000	185 000	202 000	155 000

* Until 2015, clients of more than one caisse were counted more than once. Changes in UNI Financial Cooperation's structure, and caisse mergers, enabled the merging of multiple folios and more accurate determination of member numbers.

=== Organizational structure ===
Organizational structure of UNI Financial Cooperation
- Members
- UNI Financial Cooperation
  - UNI Business
  - Support institutions
    - Conseil acadien de la coopération
    - Fondation des Caisses populaires acadiennes
  - Subsidiaries
    - UNI Insurance (Acadia Life, Acadia General Insurance, AVie)
    - Acadia Financial Services
    - Acadia Service Centre

UNI Financial Cooperation operates 51 business locations and two support institutions: the Fondation des Caisses populaires acadiennes and the Conseil acadien de la coopération. UNI Business operates four offices, while UNI Insurance maintains two regional offices.

The Acadia Service Centre offers electronic management services, cheques processing, and central processing services for the financing centre. It also processes deposits and direct withdrawals, provides Personal Property Registry services and manages title insurance records.

UNI Insurance offers its clients insurance and investment products and personalized financial services, as well as car, home and business insurance. Acadia Financial Services is a restricted dealer dedicated mainly to the distribution of mutual fund units within UNI Financial Cooperation.

=== Administration ===
The headquarters of UNI Financial Cooperation are located in Édifice Martin-J.-Légère in Caraquet. UNI Financial Cooperation is led by a board of directors chaired by Pierre Marcel Desjardins. As of January 1, 2017, the chief executive officer is Robert Moreau. Members elect 12 directors; four per region (Southeast, Northeast, Northwest), to make up the Board of Directors of UNI Financial Cooperation. The institution has nearly 1,000 employees, and a total payroll of $70 million, making it one of the largest private employers in the province.

== Community involvement ==
In 1975, the Fédération des Caisses populaires acadiennes helped to keep newspaper L’Évangéline afloat, founding Les Œuvres de presse acadiennes with the Société Nationale de l’Acadie.

Among many sponsorships, the Fédération des Caisses populaires acadiennes and the SACPA became main sponsors of the Jeux de l’Acadie in 1987. In 1999, the Mouvement sponsored the Village de la Francophonie in Dieppe alongside the 8th Francophonie Summit. Its largest sponsorship was of the Canada Winter Games in Bathurst-Campbellton in 2003.

In 1996, the institution marked its 50th anniversary with the adoption of a new corporate image and acquisition of the Collection du cinquantième, a series of contemporary art works depicting key events in the history of Acadia.

In 2003, Caisses populaires acadiennes purchased a collection of 10 works entitled Les Légendes de l’Acadie by Michel Duguay. The following year, this collection was exhibited in selected caisses throughout the province to mark the 400th anniversary of Acadia.

In 2016, the UNI Community was established to support and finance projects promoting the visibility of New Brunswick and well-being of its people. As of that year, UNI Financial Cooperation's business activities generated over $2.3 million in social contributions annually.

== CEOs ==
List of CEOs of UNI Financial Cooperation
No.	Name	Start date
1	Martin J. Légère	1947
2	Richard Savoie	1981
3	Raymond Gionet	1989
4	Gilles Lepage	1994
5	Camille H. Thériault	2004
6	Robert Moreau	2017
7	Camille H. Thériault	2023

== Chairs of the Board of Directors ==
List of Chairs of the Board of Directors of UNI Financial Cooperation
No.	Name	Start date
1^{e}	Hervé Michaud	1945
2	Ulysse Gaudet	1946
3	René E. Leblanc	1972
4	Réal Chiasson	1980
5	Kenneth Johnson	1988
6	Norbert Sivret	1993
7	Gilles Couturier	1997
8	Gérard Bertin	2000
9	Roland Cormier	2002
10	Guilda Landry	2005
11	Brian L. Comeau	2008
12	Pierre-Marcel Desjardins	2012
