= Bank Act (Canada) =

Act of the Parliament of Canada

Parliament of Canada
- Long title: An Act respecting banks and banking
- Citation: Bank Act
- Enacted by: Parliament of Canada
- Assented to: December 13, 1991

The Bank Act (1991, c. 46) (French: Loi sur les banques) is an act of the Parliament of Canada respecting banks and banking.

== History ==
The Bank Act was originally passed in 1871. The terms of the Act provide for a statutory review of the Act on a regular basis to ensure that legislators update the Act in order that it keep pace with developments in the financial system. Historically, this was done on a decennial basis. In 1992, this requirement was changed to every five years. The Act contains a "sunset" clause providing that it and the bank charters provided by it will expire unless the statutory review is conducted every five years. In 2016 the Federal Government proposed a two-year extension to the review deadline. The most recent statutory review of the Act took place in 2019 with the next review scheduled for 2023.

=== Credit unions ===
In 2010, the Parliament of Canada passed amendments to the Act to allow federal credit unions to exist as a new class of financial institution. Credit unions differ from banks in that they are member-owned, democratically controlled and governed by co-operative principles. The Bank Act allows that federal credit unions may either be created by five persons (of which three must be individuals), or through the continuance of one or more credit unions existing within provincial jurisdiction. The provisions came into force at the end of 2012.

The first federal credit union in Canada was UNI Financial Cooperation (formerly Mouvement des caisses populaires acadiennes), based in New Brunswick, which converted to a federal charter in 2016.

On June 30, 2017, the Office of the Superintendent of Financial Institutions issued an advisory, stating that it planned to enforce the Bank Act's prohibitions on using the word or verbiage "bank" in connection to any financial service that is not a bank. The terms were required to be removed from websites by the end of 2017, from print materials by the end of June 2018, and from physical signage by the end of June 2019. The announcement was criticised by credit unions, who believed that it would make it difficult to market their services in a comparable manner to banks, as well as the costs of updating marketing materials to comply with the mandate. The OSFI suspended the advisory in August 2017, after the federal government stated that it would review the rules. In February 2018, the Bank Act was amended as a riser to the federal budget, allowing credit unions to use banking vernacular to market their services.

== Structure ==
The Act groups banks in three schedules. Schedule I banks are domestic banks allowed to accept deposits. Schedule II banks are subsidiaries of foreign banks that are allowed to accept deposits through branches in Canada. Schedule III banks are foreign banks with certain restrictions upon the banking business they can conduct in Canada.

The Canadian banking industry includes 20 domestic banks, 24 foreign bank subsidiaries and 22 foreign bank branches operating in Canada. ATB Financial, a financial institution owned by the Government of Alberta, and Canada's many credit unions, are not included in this list.

== See also ==
- Banking in Canada
- List of banks and credit unions in Canada
- List of acts of the Parliament of Canada
