= Canadian banknote issuers =

Banknotes have been issued in Canada and the British colonies that confederated to form Canada from 1 July 1867.

Between 1871 and 1944, Canadian chartered banks were authorized to issue bank notes for circulation in Canada. In 1899, they were invested with the additional authority to issue bank notes for circulation in any British colony or possession. For several decades thereafter, the chartered banks were the only issuers of larger denominated notes for circulation in Canada, and an important source of notes for circulation in the British West Indies.

In 1934, the newly established Bank of Canada was given "the sole right to issue notes payable to bearer on demand". Coincident with the introduction of the new Bank of Canada notes in 1935, arrangements were made for the gradual contraction in the quantity of chartered bank notes in circulation. As of the end of 1944, the Canadian government withdrew permission for Canadian banks to issue new notes for circulation in Canada; and by 1950, liability for all outstanding Canadian bank notes was transferred to the Bank of Canada, where such notes may still be redeemed. The total value of the notes outstanding at that time was $13,302,046.60.

== Provincial Issues ==
- British Columbia: PS126-128.
- Nova Scotia: PS132-140.
- Ontario: PS141-143.
- Prince Edward Island: PS144-157.
- Province of Canada: PS161-176.

== Domestic issues ==
Notes for circulation in Canada were issued in a variety of different denominations, including 1, 2, 3, 4, 5, 10, 20, 25, 40, 50, 100, 500 and 1000 dollars. In 1871, the smallest denomination allowed was 4 dollars, which was raised to 5 dollars in 1880.

The following is a list of banks with note-issuing privileges and the periods during which they issued notes in Canada. The end dates are the dates appearing on the last note issues, but notes may have circulated for some time after.

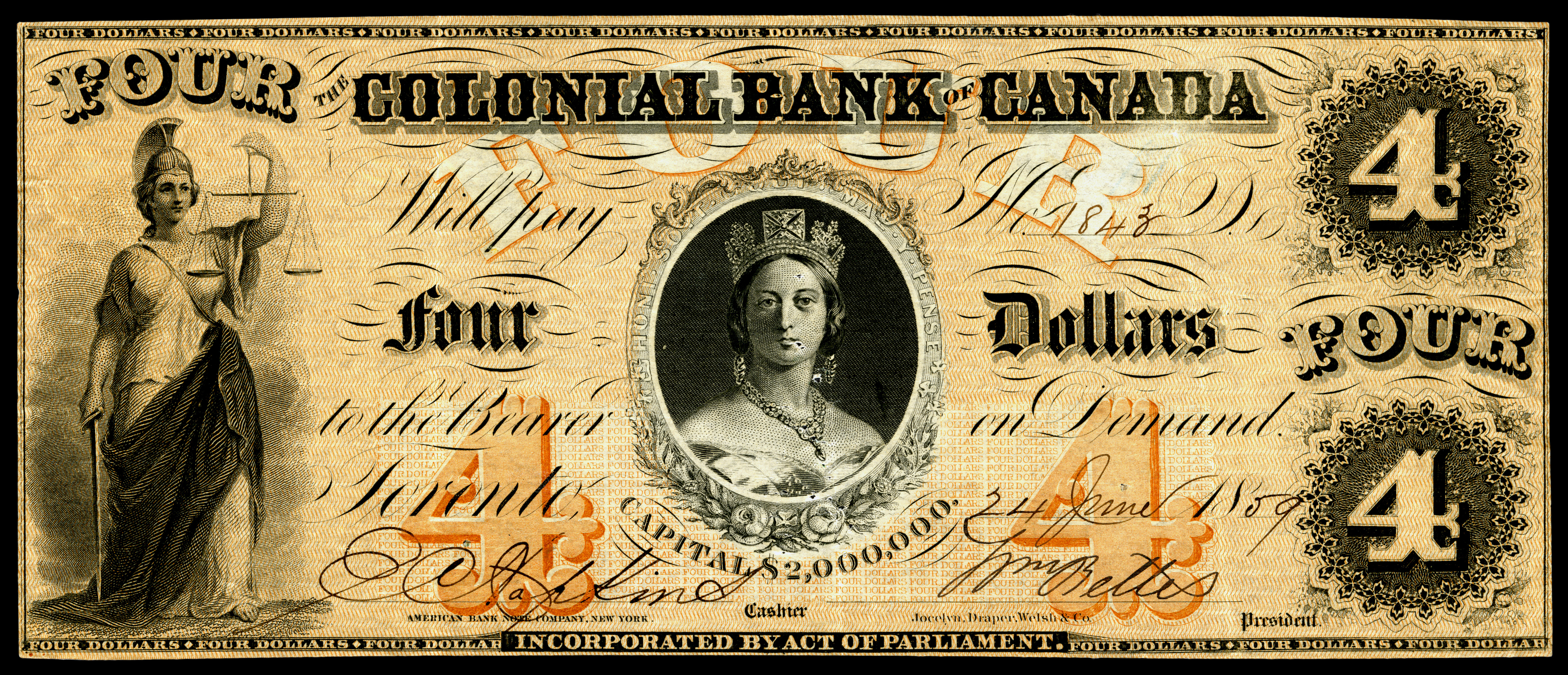
Colonial Bank of Canada, Toronto, 1859, $4.. Standing Justice (left) and portrait of Queen Victoria (centre). Obverse

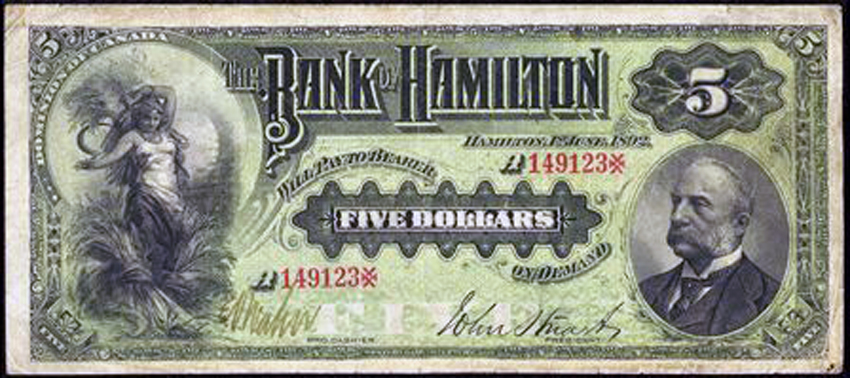
Bank of Hamilton, 1892, $5

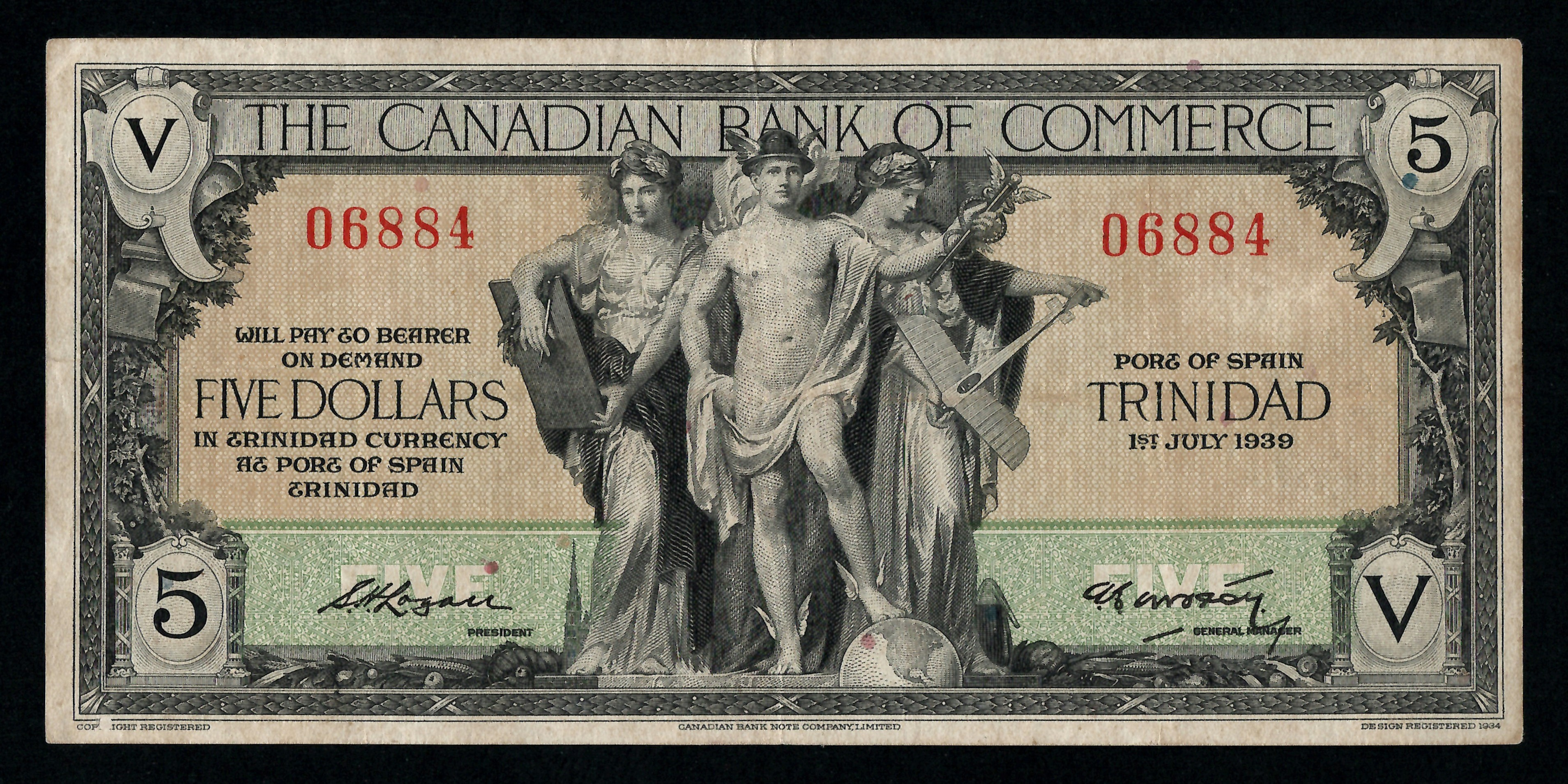
Canadian Bank of Commerce, Trinidad, 1939, $5

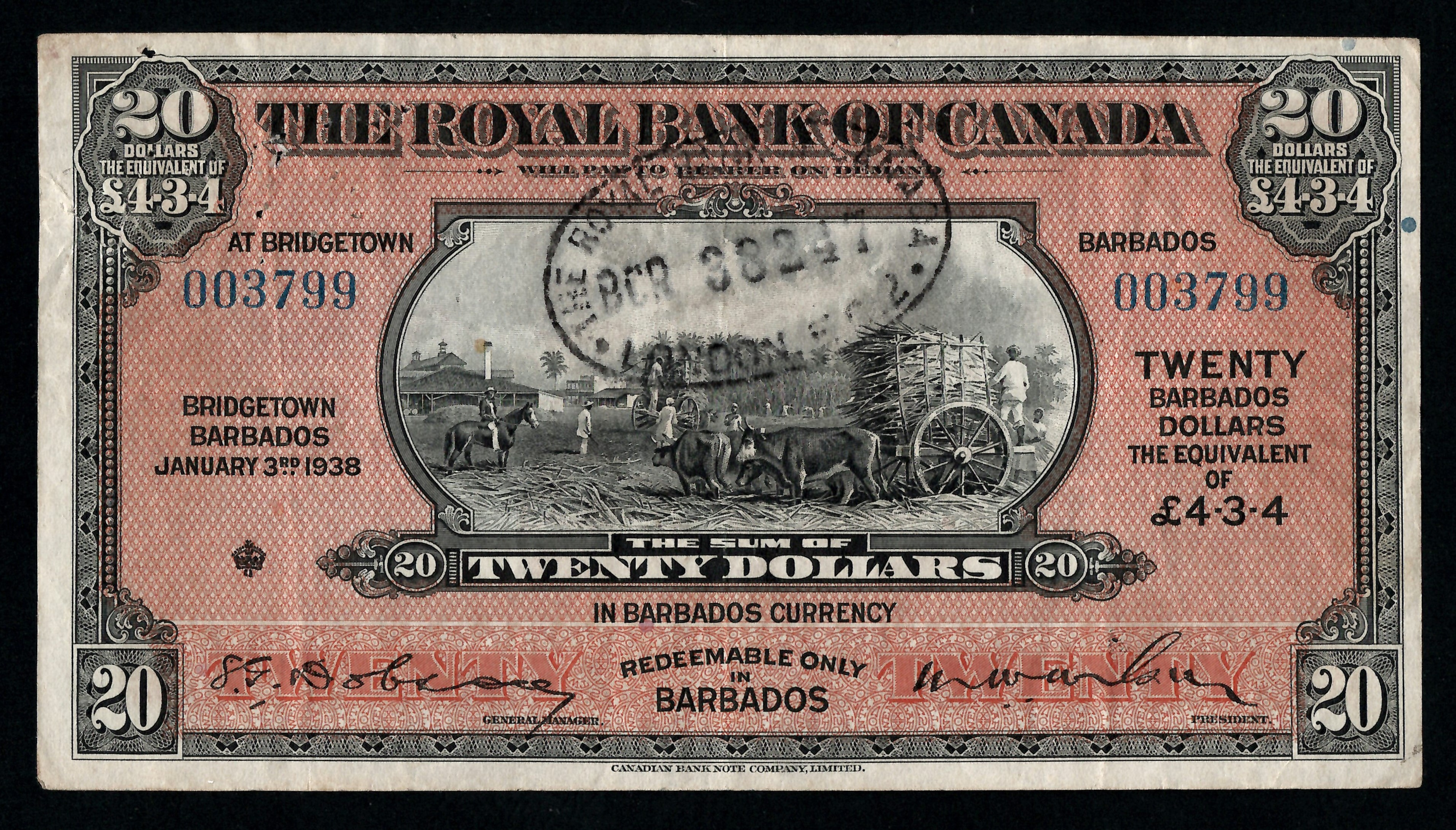
Royal Bank of Canada, Barbados, 1938, $20 or £4.3.4. Obverse

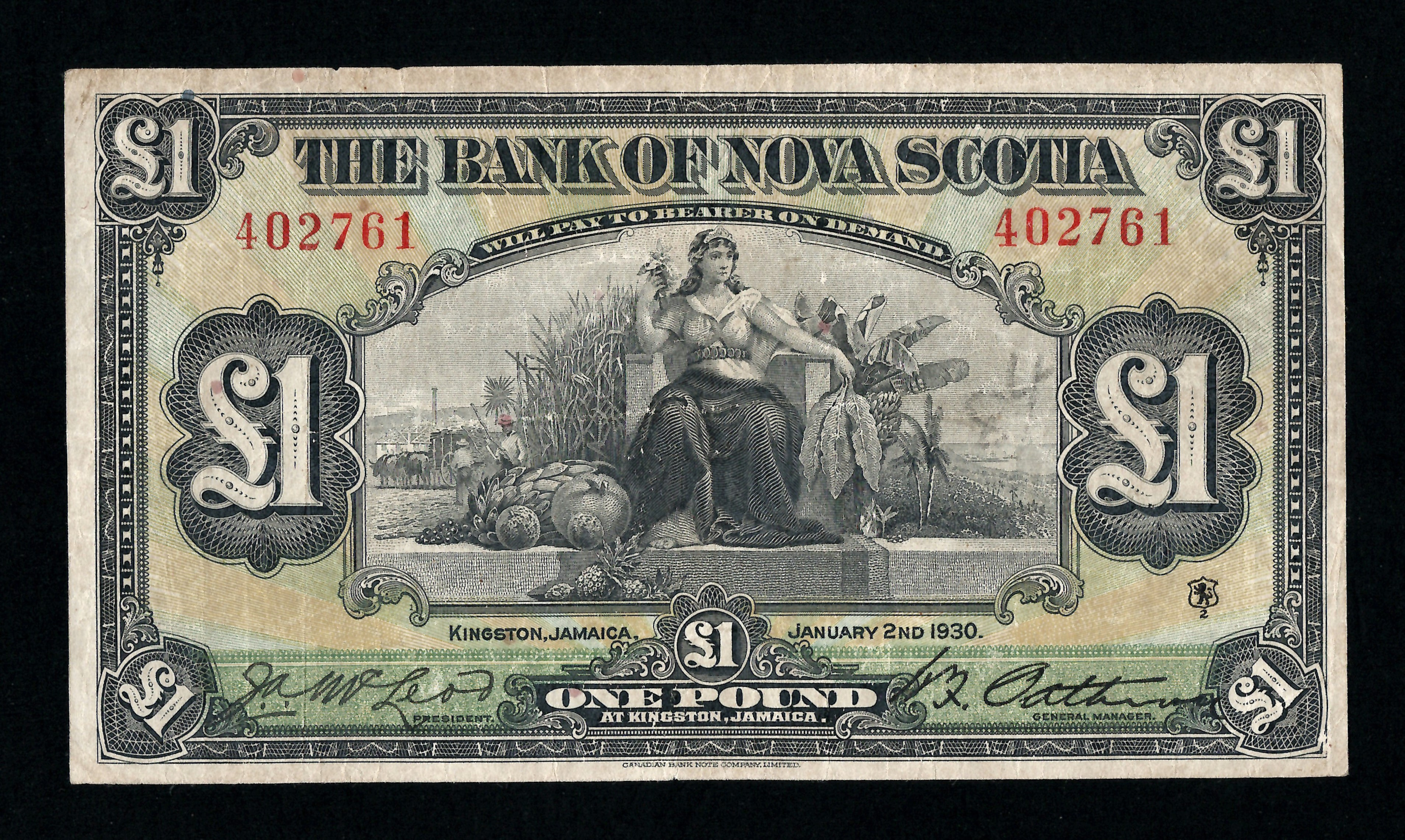
Bank of Nova Scotia, Jamaica, 1930, £1. Obverse

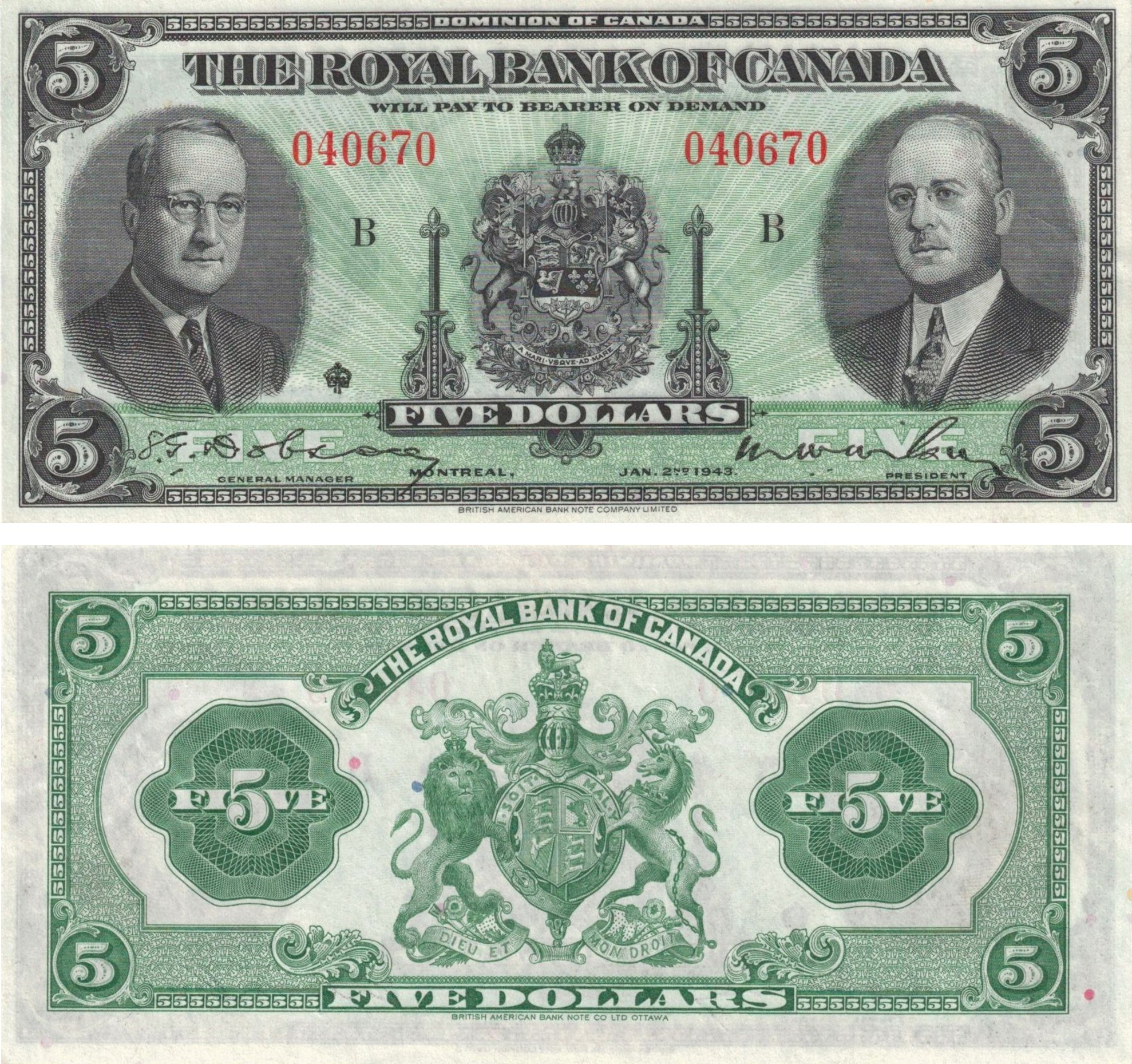
The RBC 1943 $5 note was the last note issued by a chartered bank in Canada.

List of Canadian Chartered Banks that issued notes for circulation in Canada
Bank	Dates of Issues
Agricultural Bank	1834-1837
Arman's Bank	1837
Bank of Acadia	1872
Bank of Brantford	1859
Bank of British Columbia	1862-1894
Bank of British North America	1852-1911
Bank of Clifton	1859-1861
Bank of Fredericton	1837-1838
Bank of Hamilton	1872-1922
Bank of Liverpool	1871
Bank of London	1883
Bank of Lower Canada	1839-1851
Montreal Bank/ Bank of Montreal	1817-1942
Bank of New Brunswick	1820-1906
Bank of Nova Scotia	1834-1935
Bank of Ottawa	1874-1913
Bank of Prince Edward Island	1856-1877
Bank of the County of Elgin	1856
Bank of Toronto	1856-1937
Bank of Upper Canada	1819-1861
Bank of Vancouver	1910
Bank of Western Canada	1859
Bank of Yarmouth	1860-1891
Banque De Boucherville	1837
Banque Canadienne	1836
Banque Nationale/ Banque Canadienne Nationale	1860-1935
Banque du Peuple	1835-1892
Banque de St. Hyacinthe	1874-1892
Banque de St. Jean	1873-1906
Banque d'Hochelaga	1874-1920
Banque Internationale de Canada	1862-1895
Banque Provinciale du Canada	1900-1936
Banque St. Jean Baptiste	1875
Banque Ville Marie	1873-1889
Barclays Bank Canada	1929-1935
British Canadian Bank	1884
Canada Bank Company	1792
Canadian Bank of Commerce	1867-1935
Central Bank of Canada	1884
Central Bank of New Brunswick	1847-1860
Charlotte County Bank	1852-1859
City Bank of Montreal	1833-1857
City Bank, Saint John, New Brunswick	1836-1838
Colonial Bank of Canada	1859
Commercial Bank of Canada	1857-1862
Commercial Bank of Manitoba	1885-1891
Commercial Bank of Montreal	1835-1836
Commercial Bank of New Brunswick	1837-1860
Commercial Bank of the Midland District	1832-1854
Commercial Bank of Windsor	1860-1898
Consolidated Bank of Canada	1876
Crown Bank of Canada	1904
Dominion Bank	1871-1938
Eastern Bank of Canada	1929
Eastern Townships Bank	1859-1906
Exchange Bank of Canada	1872-1873
Exchange Bank of Toronto	1855
Exchange Bank of Yarmouth	1869-1902
Farmers Bank of Canada	1907-1908
Farmers' Bank of Rustico	1864-1872
Farmers' Joint Stock Banking Company	1835-1849
Federal Bank of Canada	1874-1884
Goderich Bank	1834
Gore Bank	1836-1856
Grenville County Bank	1856
Halifax Banking Company	1825-1898
Hart's Bank	1837-1838
Henry's Bank	1837
Home Bank of Canada	1904-1920
Hudson's Bay Company	1820-1870
Imperial Bank of Canada	1875-1939
International Bank of Canada	1858-1859
MacDonald and Co.	1863
Maritime Bank of the Dominion of Canada	1873-1882
Mechanics Bank of Montreal	1872
Mercantile Banking Corporation	1878
Merchants Bank of Canada	1868-1919
Merchants Bank of Halifax	1864-1899
Merchants Bank in Montreal	1874
Merchants Bank of Montreal	1837
Merchants Bank of Prince Edward Island	1871-1900
Metropolitan Bank, Montreal	1872
Metropolitan Bank of Toronto	1902-1912
Molsons Bank	1837-1922
Newcastle District Loan Company	1836
Newcastle Banking Company	1836
Niagara District Bank	1854-1872
Niagara Suspension Bridge Bank	1836-1841
Northern Bank	1905
Northern Crown Bank	1908-1914
Ontario Bank	1857-1898
People's Bank of Halifax	1864-1903
People's Bank of New Brunswick	1864-1905
Pictou Bank of Nova Scotia	1874-1882
Provincial Bank of Canada in Stanstead	1856
Quebec Bank	1818-1911
Royal Bank of Canada	1901-1943
Royal Canadian Bank	1865-1872
Saint Francis Bank	1850
Sovereign Bank of Canada	1902-1907
St. Lawrence Bank	1872
St. Stephens Bank	1830-1903
Stadacona Bank	1874
Standard Bank of Canada	1876-1924
Sterling Bank of Canada	1906-1921
Summerside Bank of Prince Edward Island	1866-1900
Tattersall Bank	1830
Traders Bank of Canada	1885-1910
Union Bank	1838
Union Bank of Canada	1886-1921
Union Bank of Halifax	1861-1909
Union Bank of Lower Canada	1866-1871
Union Bank of Montreal	1840
Union Bank of Prince Edward Island	1864-1877
United Empire Bank of Canada	1906
Western Bank of Canada	1882-1890
Westmorland Bank	1854-1861
Weyburn Security Bank	1911
Zimmerman Bank	1854-1856

== Chartered Banks ==
Canadian chartered banks historically issuing banknotes
Bank Name	ID
Bank of British Columbia	PS201-219.
Bank of British North America	PS221-435.
Bank of Hamilton	PS441-468.
Bank of Montreal	PS471-564.
Bank of New Brunswick	PS571-599.
Bank of Nova Scotia	PS601-633.
Bank of Ottawa	PS636-664.
Bank of Toronto	PS666-693.
Bank of Vancouver	PS696-700.
Bank of Yarmouth	PS701-704.
Banque Canadienne Nationale (National Bank of Canada)	PS706-717.
Banque d'Hochelaga (Bank of Hochelaga)	PS721-815.
Banque Internationale du Canada (International Bank of Canada)	PS816-818.
Banque Jacques Cartier (Jacques Cartier Bank)	PS821-837.
Banque Nationale (National Bank)	PS841-875.
Bank of the People	PS875A-875E.
Banque du Peuple (Bank of the People)	PS876-909.
Banque Provincale du Canada (Provincial Bank of Canada)	PS911-922.
Banque de St. Hyacinthe (Bank of Saint Hyacinthe)	PS924-929.
Banque de St. Jean (Bank of Saint Jean)	PS931-935.
Banque Ville Marie	PS936-946.
Barclays Bank Canada	PS947-951.
Canadian Bank of Commerce	PS952-972.
City Bank	PS972A-972C.
Commercial Bank of Canada	PS973-996.
Commercial Bank of Manitoba	PS997-1000.
Commercial Bank of the Midland District	PS1000A-1000W.
Commercial Bank of Windsor	PS1001-1004.
Crown Bank of Canada	PS1006-1009.
Dominion Bank	PS1011-1036.
Eastern Townships Bank	PS1041-1057.
Exchange Bank of Yarmouth	PS1058-1060.
Farmers Bank of Canada	PS1061-1065.
Gore Bank	PS1066-1069.
Halifax Banking Company	PS1070-1086.
Home Bank of Canada	PS1087-1091.
Hudson's Bay Company	PS1095-1121.
Imperial Bank of Canada	PS1122-1145H.
Merchants' Bank of Canada	PS1146-1173.
Merchants' Bank of Halifax	PS1174-1189.
Merchants' Bank of Prince Edward Island	PS1191-1196.
Metropolitan Bank	PS1197-1201.
Molsons Bank	PS1202-1243.
Montreal Bank	PS1243A-1243K.
Niagara District Bank	PS1243L-1243V.
Northern Bank	PS1244-1247.
Northern Crown Bank	PS1248-1251.
Ontario Bank	PS1252-1286.
Peoples' Bank of Halifax	PS1287-1290.
Peoples' Bank of New Brunswick	PS1291-1302.
Quebec Bank	PS1306-1368.
Royal Bank of Canada	PS1369-1394.
Saint Lawrence Bank	PS1395-1399.
Saint Stephen's Bank	PS1400-1430.
Sovereign Bank of Canada	PS1431-1434.
Standard Bank of Canada	PS1435-1447.
Sterling Bank of Canada	PS1448-1453.
Summerside Bank of Prince Edward Island	PS1454-1465.
Traders' Bank of Canada	PS1466-1482.
Union Bank of Canada	PS1483-1507.
Union Bank of Halifax	PS1511-1521.
Union Bank of Lower Canada	PS1521A-1521J.
Union Bank of Prince Edward Island	PS1522-1533.
United Empire Bank of Canada	PS1534-1535.
Western Bank of Canada	PS1536-1538.
Weyburn Security Bank	PS1539-1541.

== British West Indies issues ==
In the British West Indies, Canadian bank notes circulated from 1900 to 1950 alongside notes of the Colonial Bank (later, Barclays Bank) and, in some places, notes of smaller denominations issued by local authorities.

The following is a list of the Canadian banks that issued notes for circulation in the British West Indies, together with the dates and denominations of those issues.

List of Canadian Chartered Banks that issued notes for circulation outside of Canada
Bank	Dates of Issues	Denominations
Canadian Bank of Commerce
Barbados	1922 and 1940	$5, $20, $100
Jamaica	1921 and 1938	£1, £5
Trinidad	1921 and 1939	$5, $20, $100
Bank of Nova Scotia
Jamaica	1900, 1919, 1920 and 1930	£1, £5
Royal Bank of Canada
Antigua	1913, 1920 and 1938	$5
Barbados	1909, 1920 and 1938	$5, $20, $100
British Guiana	1913, 1920 and 1938	$5, $20, $100
Dominica	1913, 1920 and 1938	$5
Grenada	1909, 1920 and 1938	$5
Jamaica	1911 and 1938	£1, £5
St Kitts	1913, 1920 and 1938	$5
St Lucia	1920	$5
Trinidad	1909, 1920 and 1938	$5, $20, $100
Union Bank of Halifax
Trinidad	1905	$5, $10, $20, $50, $100

== Spurious or Expired Banks ==
The following banks issued notes that cannot be exchanged for current Canadian dollar banknotes.

Bank	Catalog numbers
Bank of Acadia	PS1542–1545
Accommodation Bank	PS1546–1547
Agricultural Bank, Montreal	PS1548–1550
Agricultural Bank, Toronto	PS1551–1564
Arman's Bank	PS1565–1567
Banque de Boucherville (Bank of Boucherville)	PS1568
Bank of Brantford	PS1569–1576
British Canadian Bank	PS1577–1578
Canada Bank, Montreal	PS1579–1580
Canada Bank, Toronto	PS1581–1583
Bank of Canada, Montreal (Note: Unrelated to the current Bank of Canada.)	PS1584–1595
Banque Canadienne (Canadian Bank)	S1596–1599
Central Bank of Canada	PS1600–1602
Central Bank of New Brunswick	PS1603–1617
Charlotte County Bank	PS1618–1622
Bank of Charlottetown	PS1623–1625

== See also ==
- Bank of Canada
- Canadian pound
- Central banks and currencies of the Caribbean
- Commonwealth banknote-issuing institutions
- Currencies of the British West Indies
