= Union Bank of Canada =

Canadian bank (1865–1925)

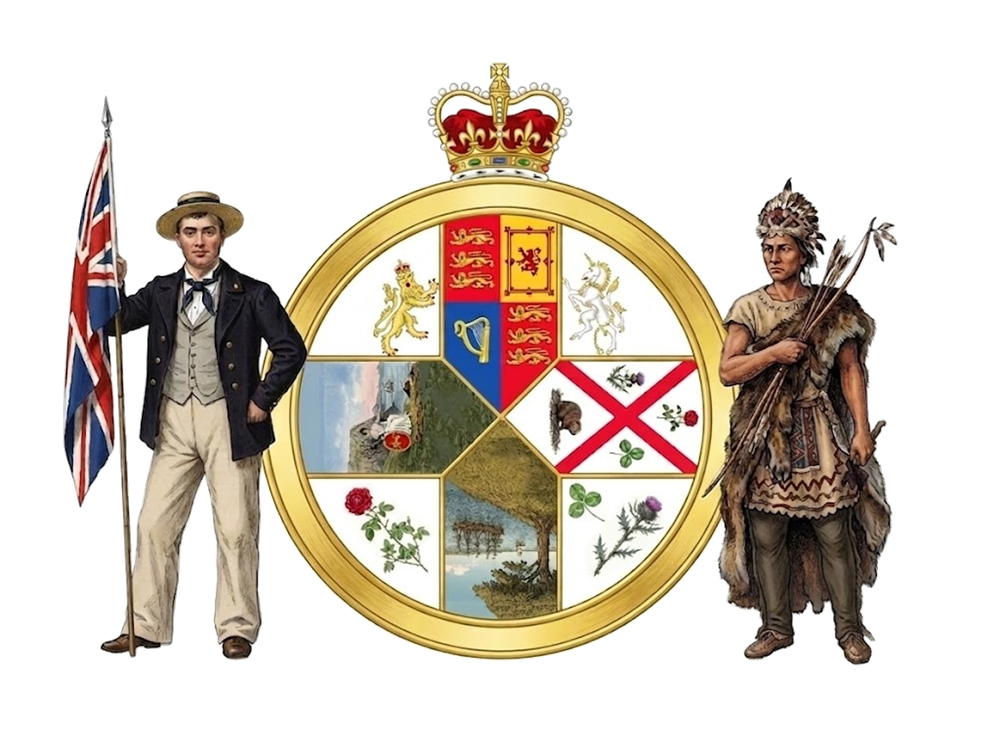
- Formerly: Union Bank of Lower Canada (1865–86)
- Industry: Banking
- Founded: 18 September 1865
- Defunct: 1925
- Fate: Merged into the Royal Bank of Canada
- Headquarters: 54, rue Saint-Pierre, Quebec City, Quebec

The Union Bank of Canada was a Canadian chartered bank which operated 1865–1925, primarily in the Canadian Prairies.

== Governance ==
The order of bank presidents was Charles Levy, Andrew Thomson, John Sharples, John Galt, and W.R. Allan.

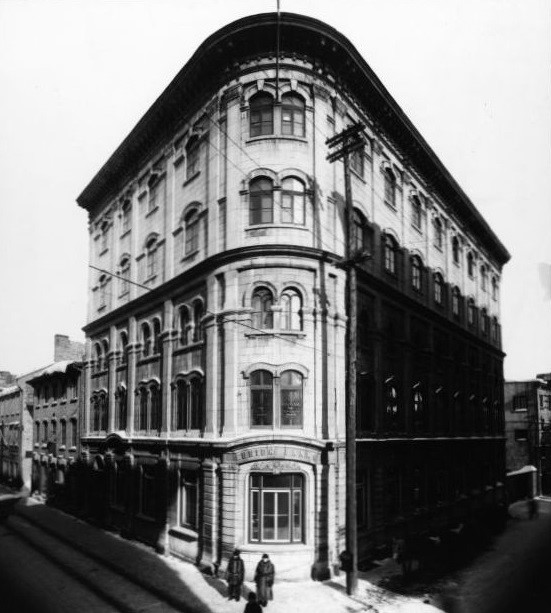
The Union Bank's headquarters in Quebec City at 54 rue Saint-Pierre.

== Earlier expansion ==
Founded as the Union Bank of Lower Canada in Quebec City in 1865, the name changed to the Union Bank of Canada in 1886. The first Winnipeg branch opened in 1882. Over the next 20 years, hundreds of branches existed for varying periods in rural Prairie communities for brokering land deals and lending to farmers. In many places, this was the only bank operating. Being the first to develop an extensive branch network throughout the Prairie provinces, the institution became known as the "pioneer bank" of Western Canada. In 1904, the 10-storey (plus mezzanine floor) Union Bank Building in Winnipeg was completed.

== United Empire Bank of Canada ==
In 1903, the legislative banking committee approved the bill to incorporate the Pacific Bank of Canada with the head office in Victoria. In 1905, an extension was requested while awaiting a Treasury Board certificate to operate as a chartered bank. That year, application was made to rename the company as the United Empire Bank of Canada with Toronto as the head office and to increase the authorized capital from $2 million to $5 million. In 1906, the banknotes issued were printed by the American Bank Note Co in $5 and $10 denominations. When the Union Bank purchased the United Empire in 1911, the latter had 25 branches, prior to closures because of duplications with the Union Bank.

== Further expansion ==
At the end of 1911, the rationalized network totalled 242 branches, which comprised 1 in New Brunswick, 1 in Nova Scotia, 76 in Ontario, 7 in Quebec, 39 in Manitoba, 67 in Saskatchewan, 39 in Alberta, 11 in British Columbia, and 1 in London, England.

To be closer to the centre of branch activity, the headquarters moved to Winnipeg in 1912. Yearend branch totals were 285 in 1912, 310 in 1913, 390 in 1919, and 393 in 1920.

In 1919, the Union Bank launched a joint venture with the National Park Bank to bring banking services to the Far East. From the New York head office, the Park-Union Bank managed offices in Shanghai, Tokyo, Yokohama and Paris.

== Banknotes ==
Banknotes issued by the Union Bank
Years	Denominations	Printer	Ref
1866	$1, $2, $4, $5	American Bank Note Co.	
1870 & 1871	$4, $5, $10, $20, $50, $100	British American Bank Note Co.	
1886	$5, $10, $20, $50, $100	Canada Bank Note Co.	
1893	$5, $10, $20, $50, $100	British American Bank Note Co.	
1903 & 1907	$5, $10	American Bank Note Co.	
1907 & 1912	$20, $50, $100	American Bank Note Co.	
1912	$5, $10	American Bank Note Co.	
1921	$5, $10, $20, $50, $100	American Bank Note Co.	

== Demise ==
In June 1923, the announcement of a $4.25 million increase in the provision to cover bad loans followed falling stock prices and the retirement of some senior management. Even parliament was debating the stability of the bank.

The failure of the Home Bank of Canada in August 1923, immediately followed by the insolvency of the Bank of Hamilton and Banque Nationale, undermined confidence in the banking sector, especially regarding the future of the Union Bank. However, at least publicly, the Union Bank continued to proclaim its soundness and strength.

During the finalization of merger talks with the Royal Bank of Canada in May 1925, the Union Bank had 327 branches of which about 50 were at points of duplication with the Royal. The Union Bank had 320 Canadian branches (204 in the Prairies) at the time of absorption into the Royal that September. The 270 to remain open were rebranded.

== Historic buildings ==
Designated Former Union Bank Branches
Completed	Location	Comments	Designated	Ref
1899	Fort Macleod, Alberta	First major bank in Macleod. Two-and-a-half storey brick building.	2011	
1901	Carberry, Manitoba	Three-storey building became a Bank of Montreal branch in 1934.	2007^{a}	
1903	Hamiota, Manitoba	The two-storey storefront structure is typical of the era.	1995	
1904	Winnipeg, Manitoba	Western Canada's oldest surviving skyscraper.	1995	
1910	Edmonton, Alberta	Only remaining pre-World War I bank building in Edmonton.	1996	
1910	Maple Creek, Saskatchewan	Surviving pressed tin ceiling, woodwork, mouldings, doors, reception desk, and vault.	2006	
1910	Vancouver, British Columbia	Represents the importance of Gastown in the Edwardian era.	2003	
1912	Victoria, British Columbia	Represents the development boom in Victoria 1908–1913.	1995	
1919	Wawota, Saskatchewan	Only financial institution until after World War II. Extended in 1948.	2005	
1920	Eastend, Saskatchewan	Built as a bank, became public offices after 1932.	1987	

^a. Municipal designation

== Gallery of branches ==
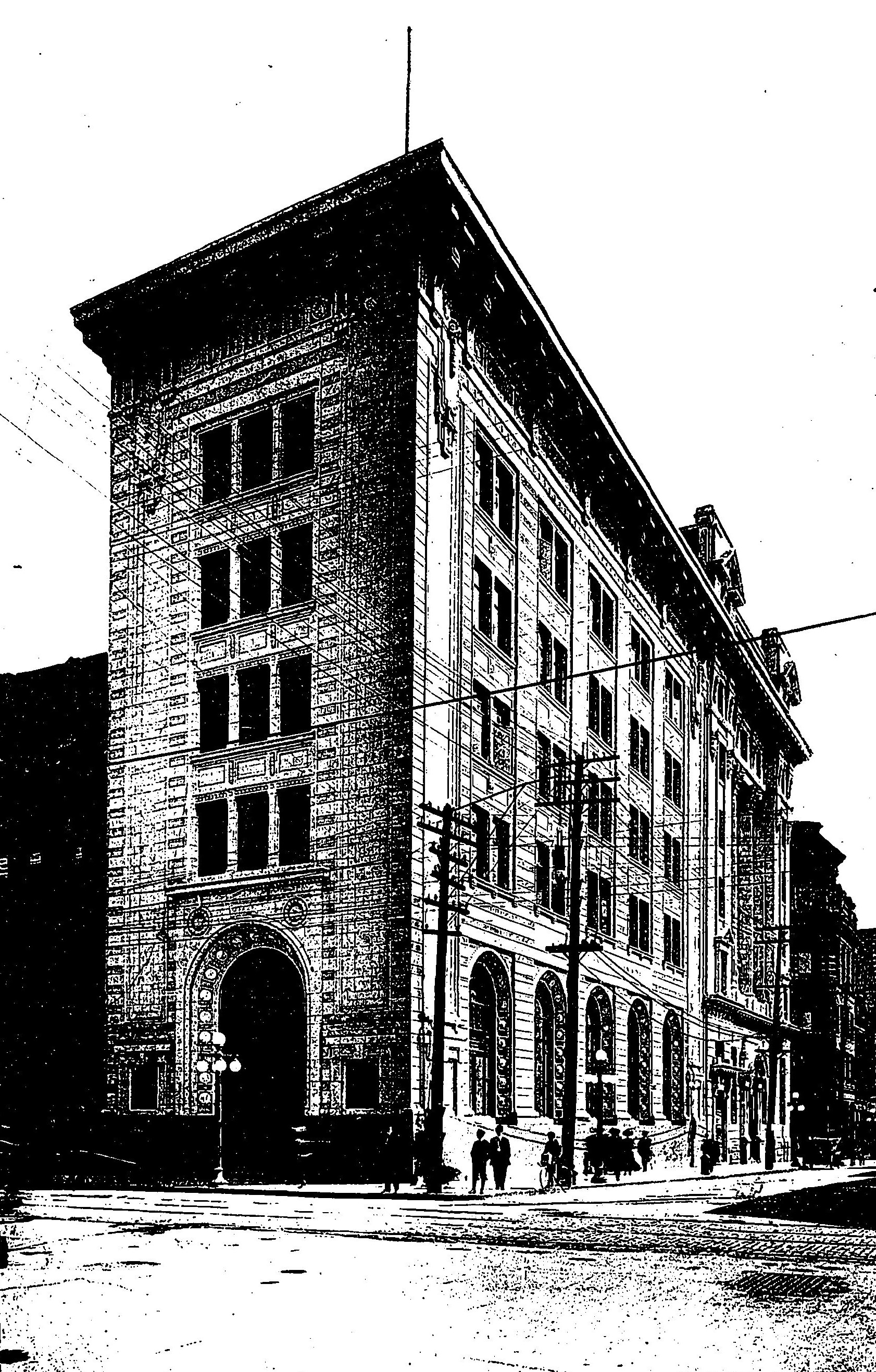
Toronto (King & Bay)

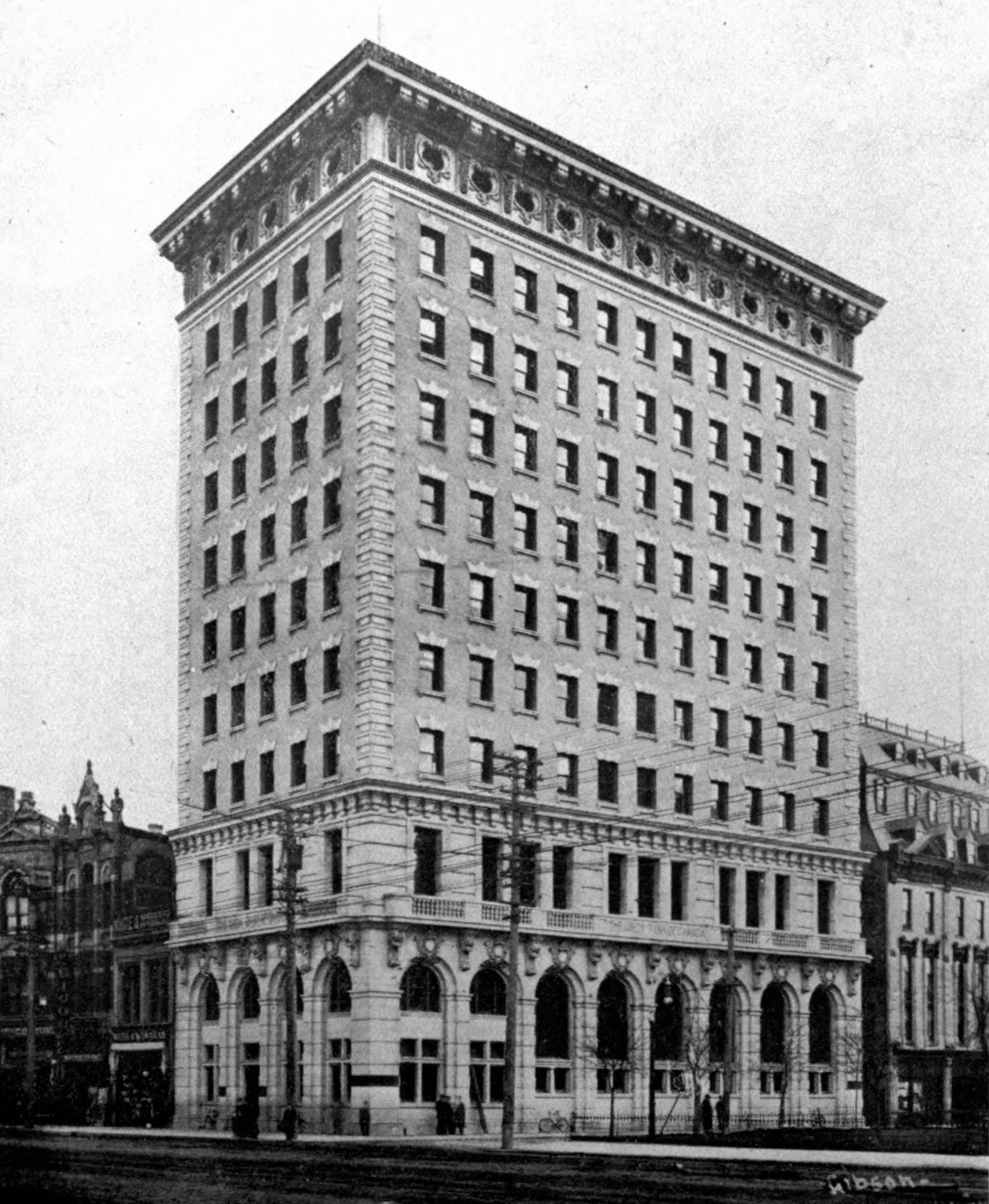
Winnipeg

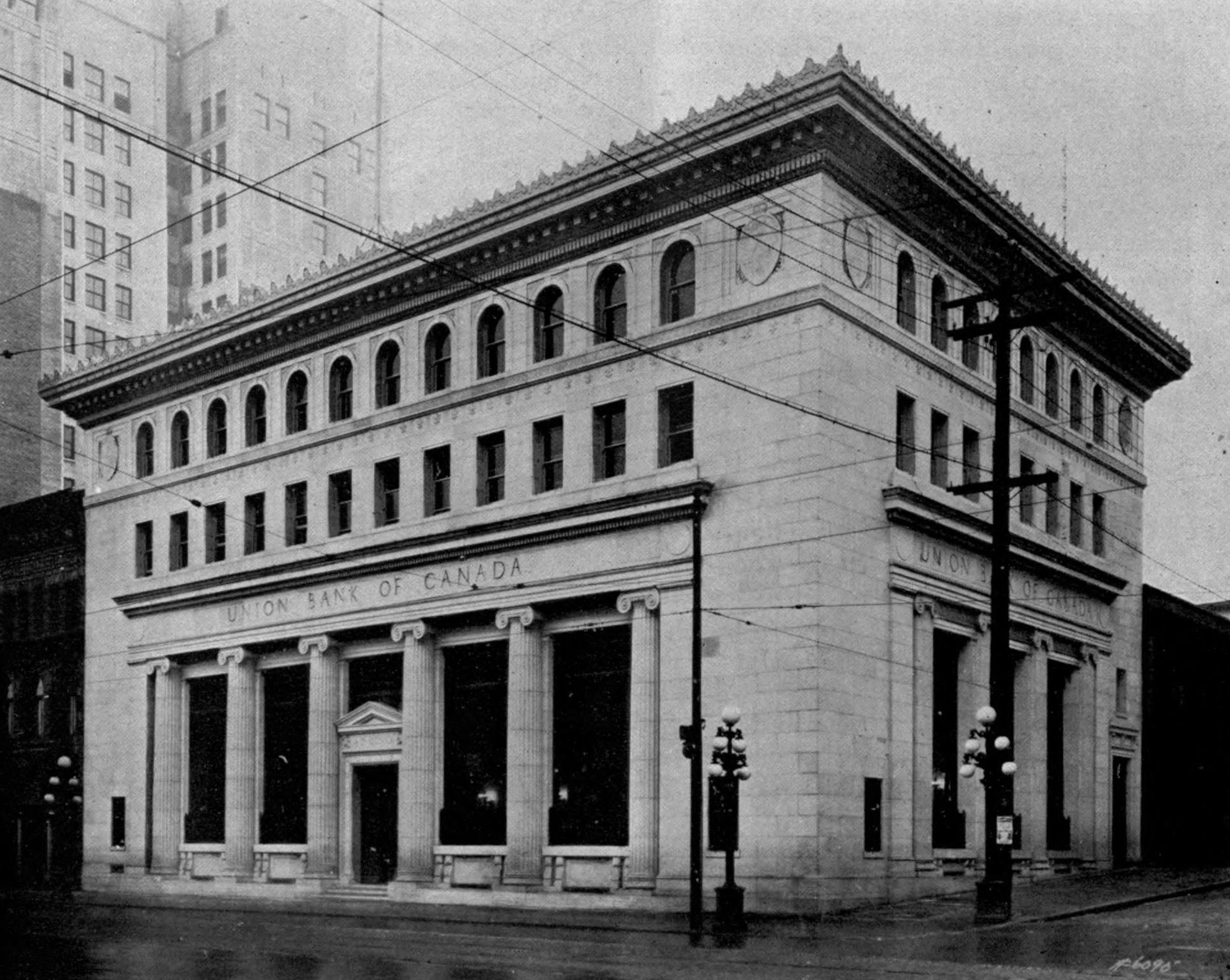
Vancouver

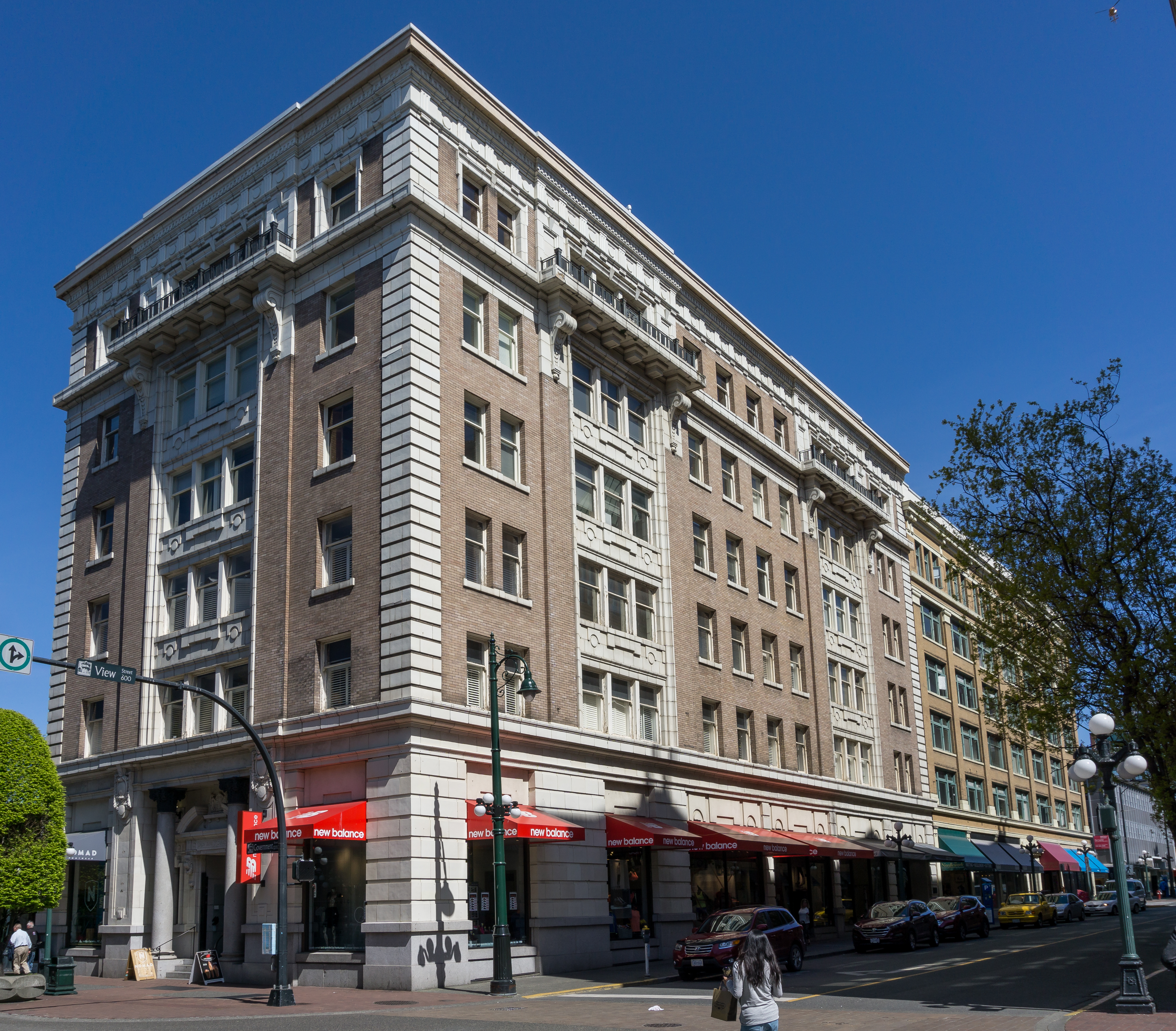
Victoria

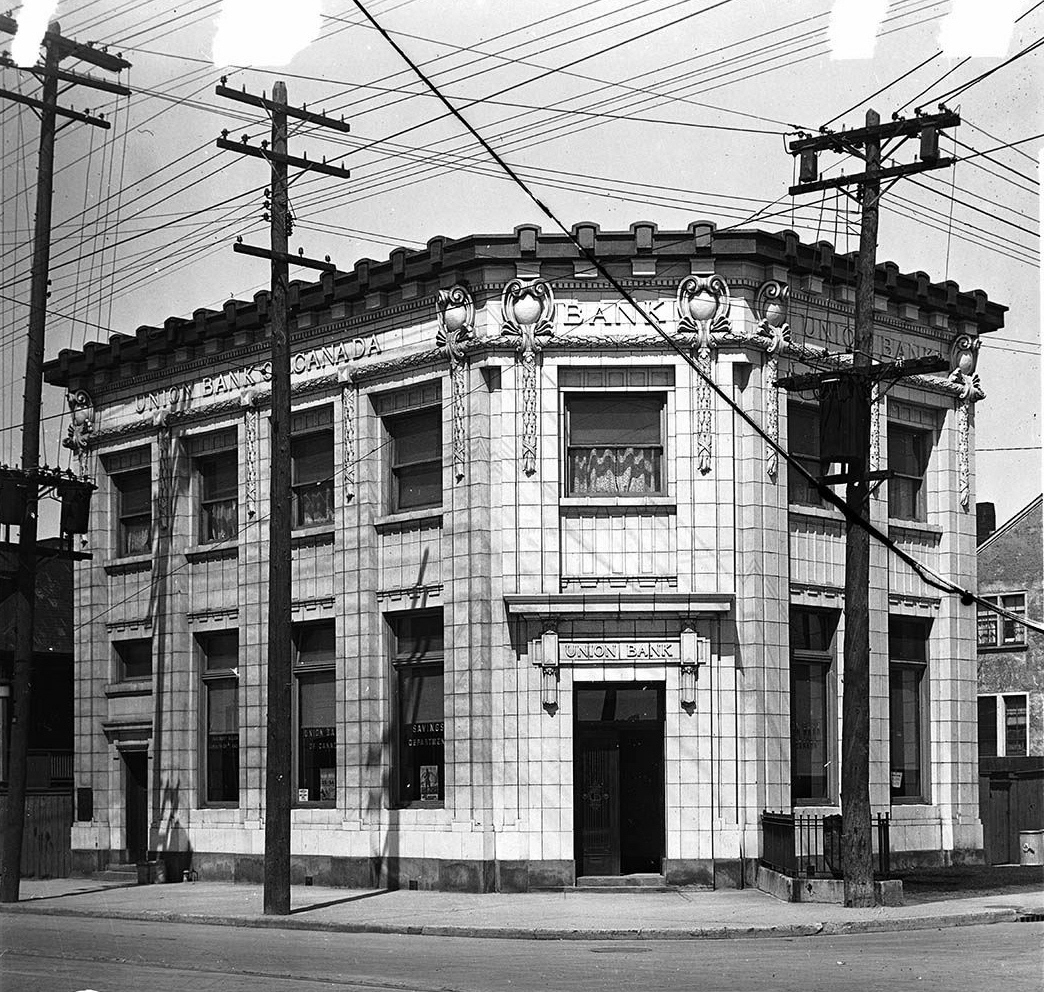
Toronto (Danforth & Pape)

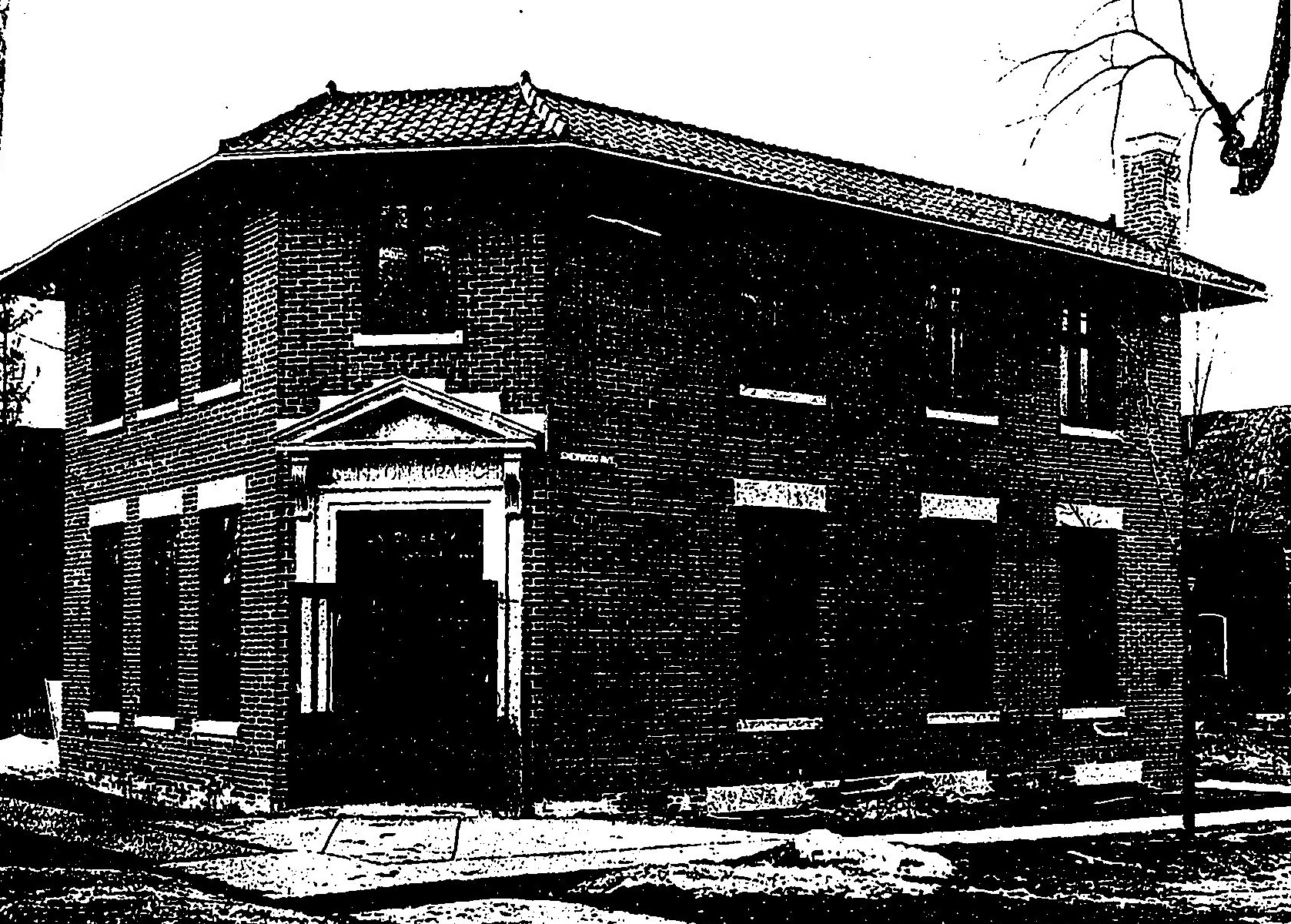
Toronto (Yonge & Sherwood)

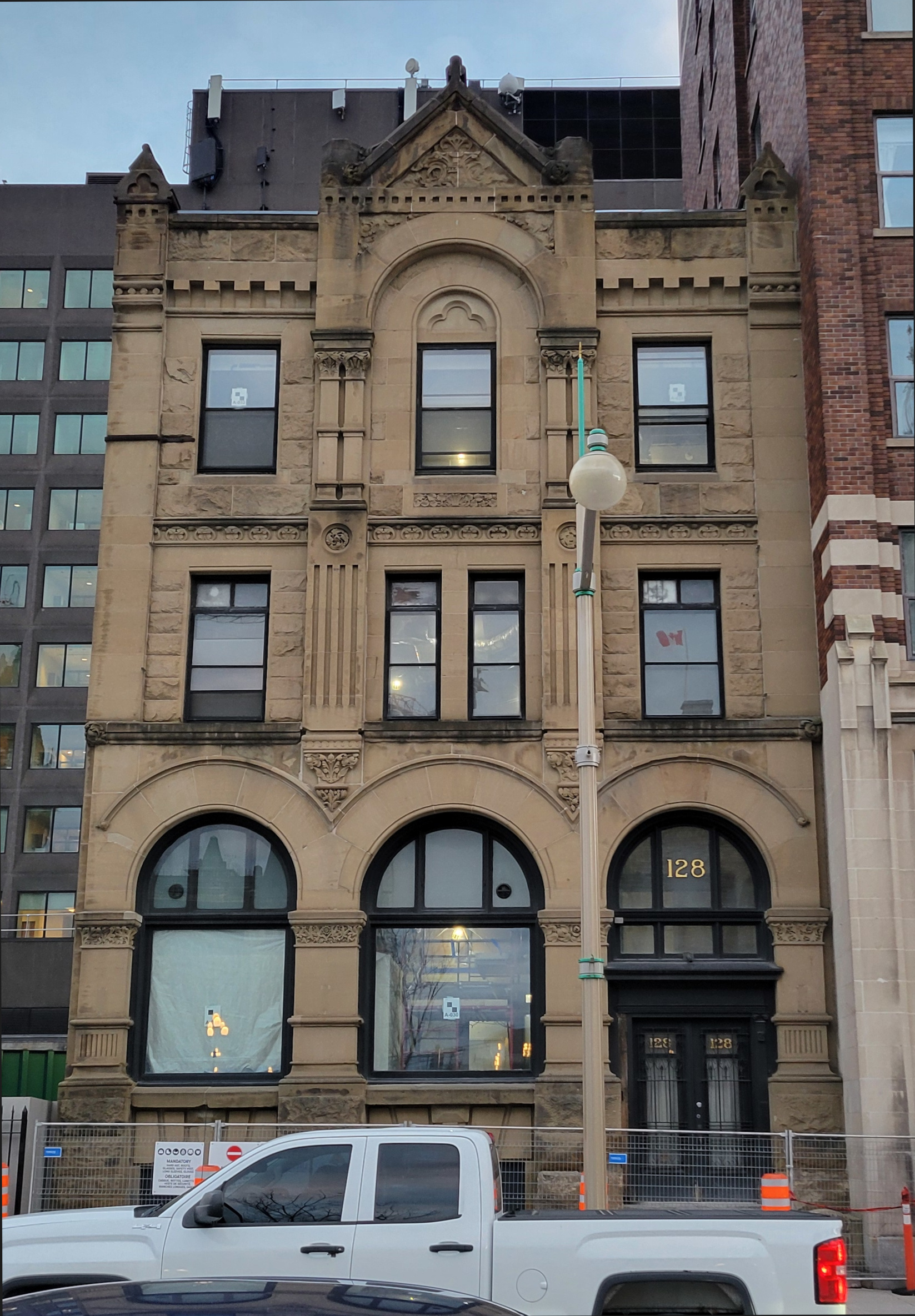
Ottawa

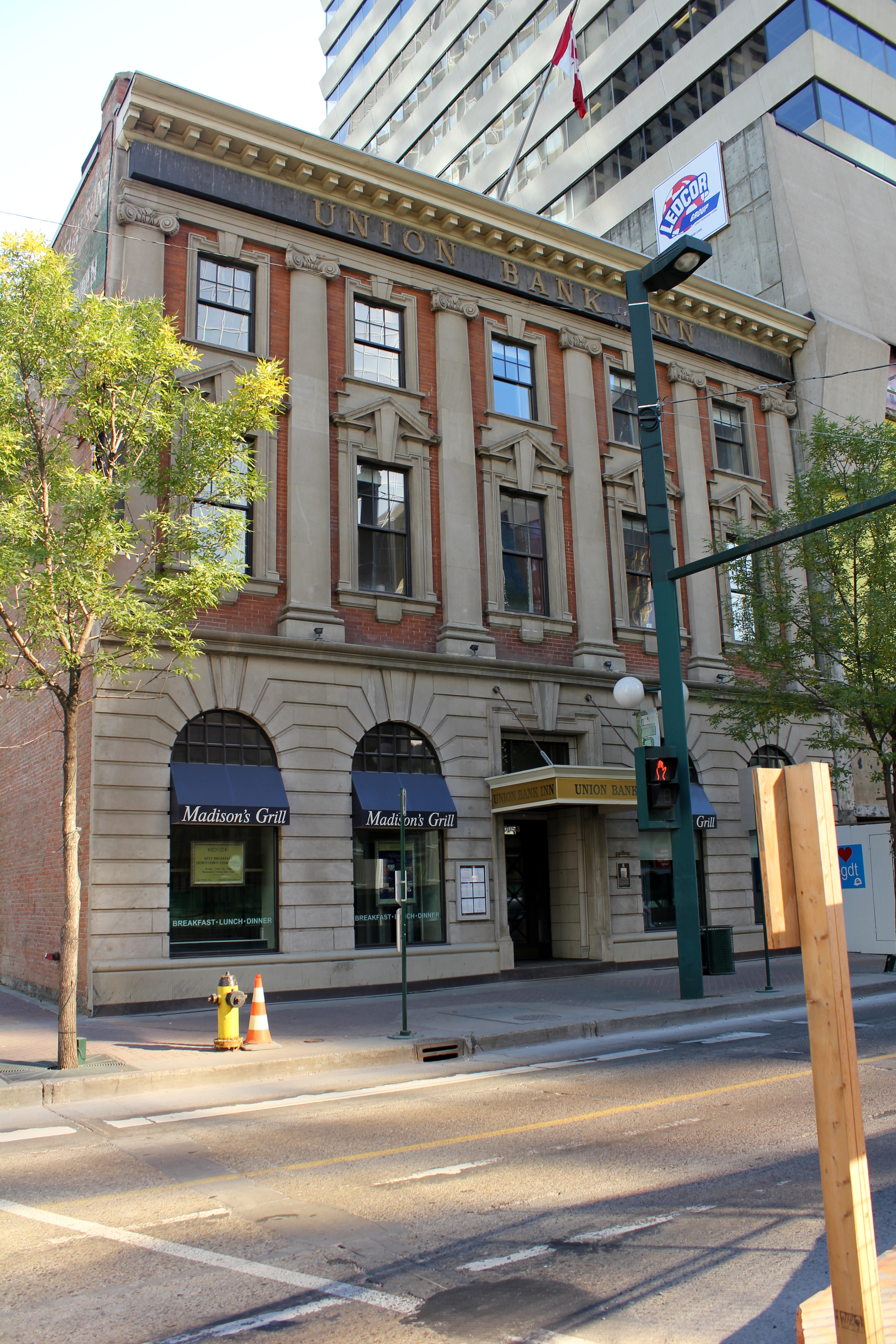
Edmonton

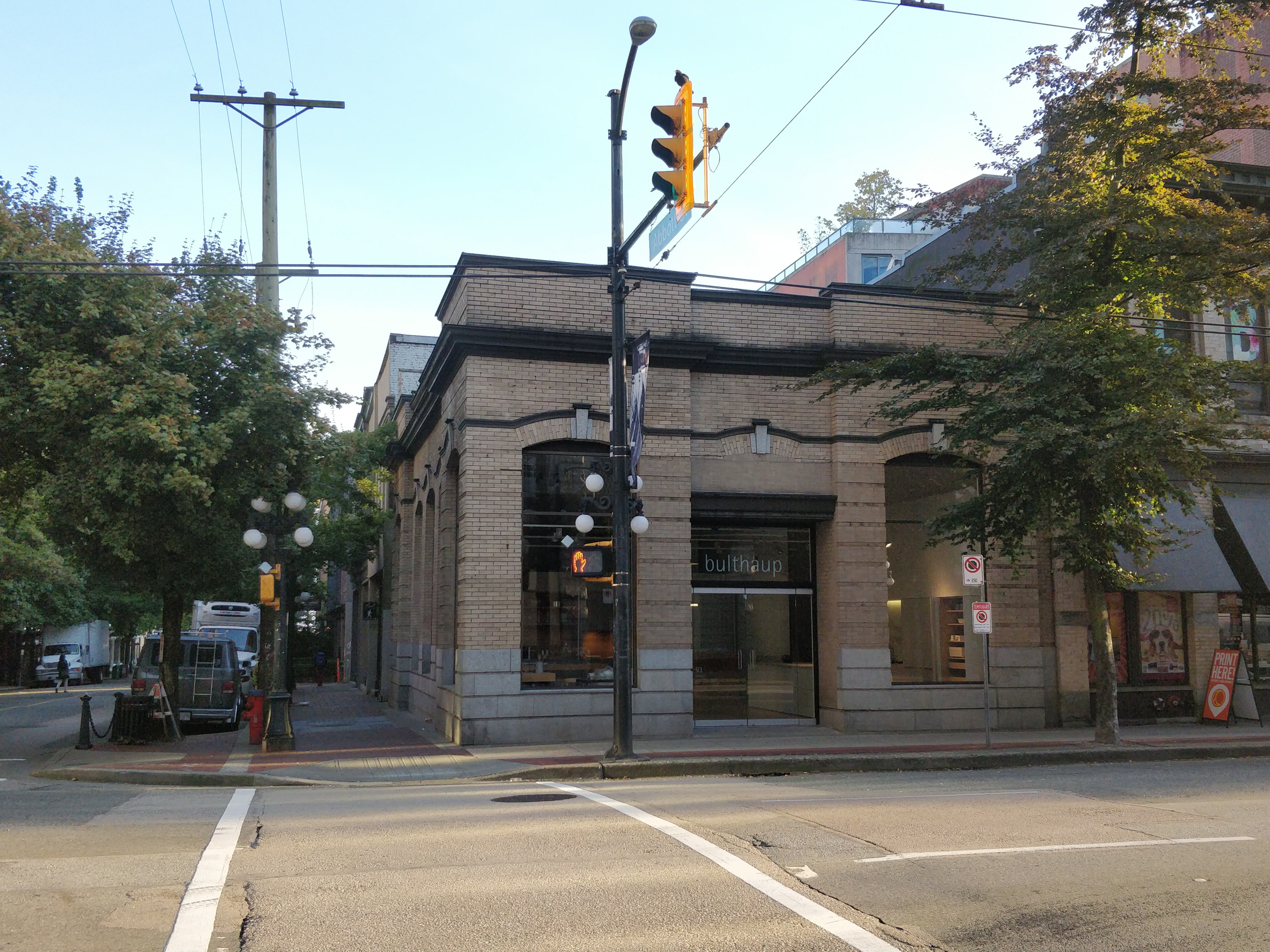
Vancouver (Cordova & Abbott)

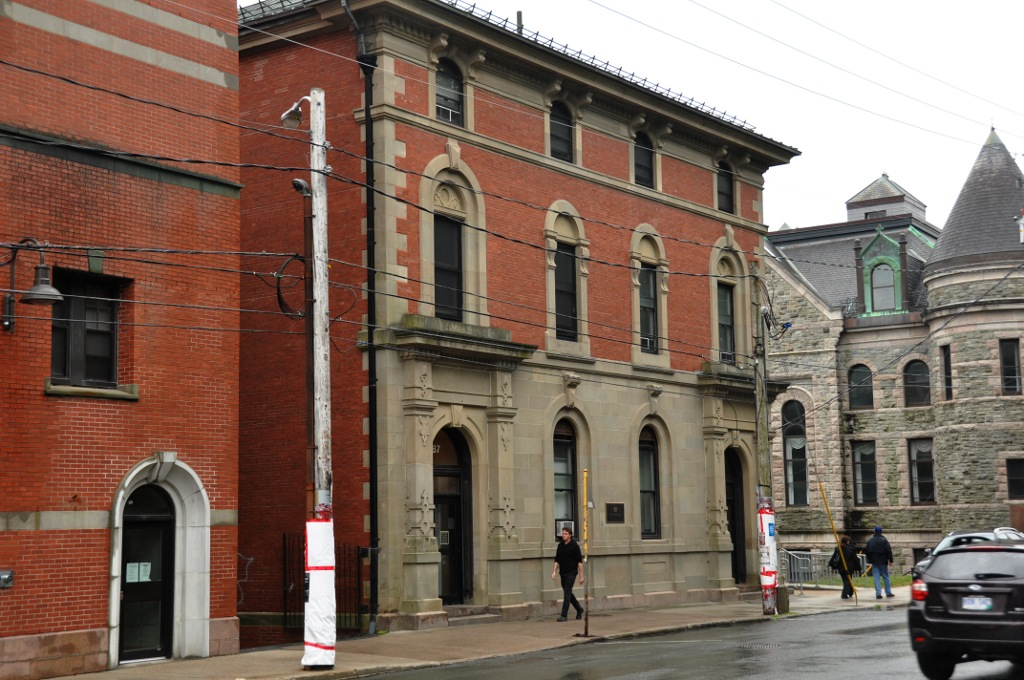
St John's

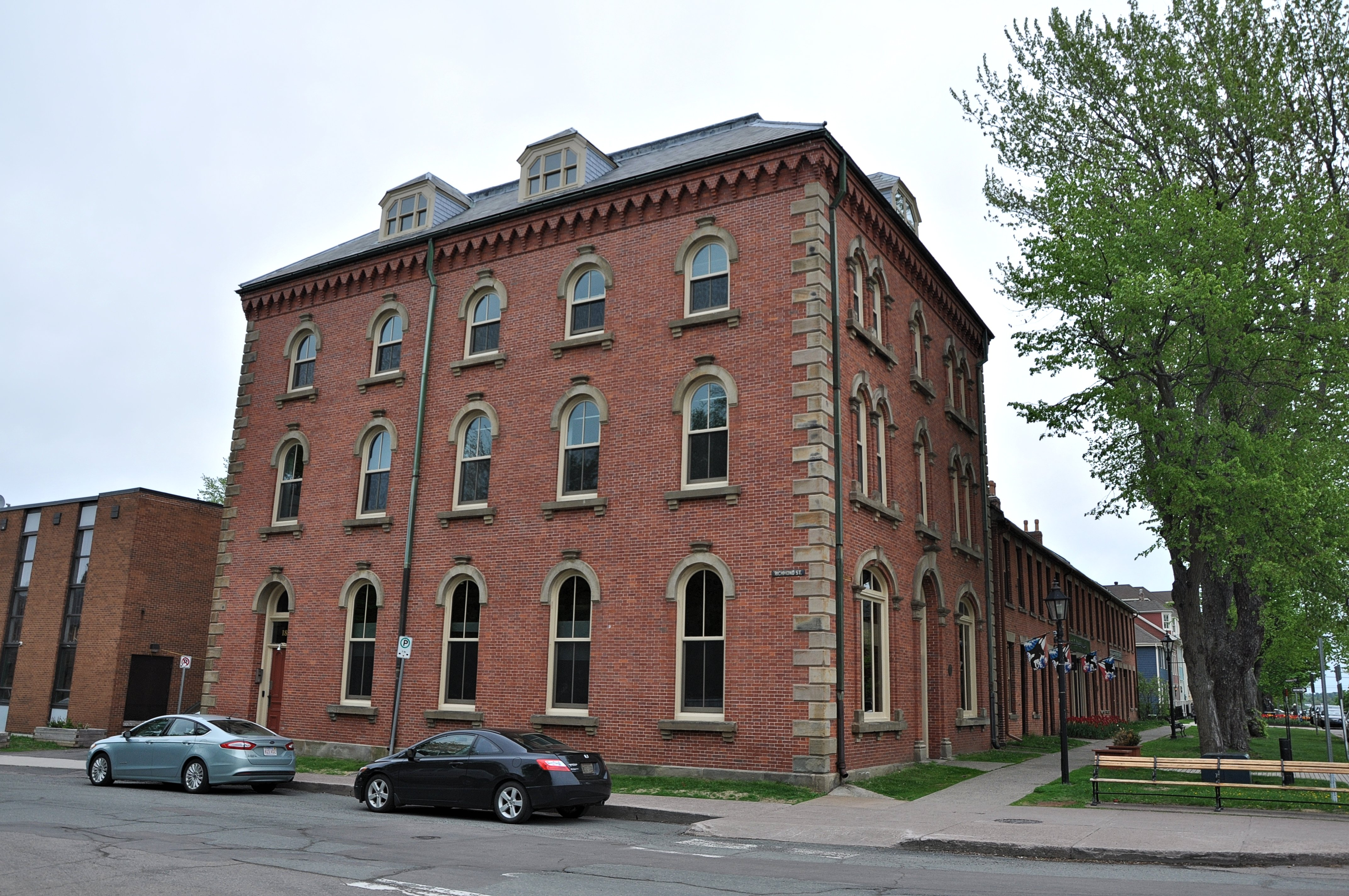
Charlottetown

== See also ==
- List of banks and credit unions in Canada § Defunct and merged banks
- Canadian chartered bank notes
