= Bank of Ottawa =

Canadian bank (1874–1919)

- Industry: Banking
- Founded: 1874
- Defunct: 1919
- Fate: Acquired by the Bank of Nova Scotia
- Headquarters: 116 Wellington Street, Ottawa, Ontario

The Bank of Ottawa was an early Canadian banking establishment in the Ottawa Valley, Ontario. Branches included Ottawa, Carp, Pembroke, Keewatin and Winnipeg, Manitoba. It merged with the Bank of Nova Scotia in 1919.

== History ==
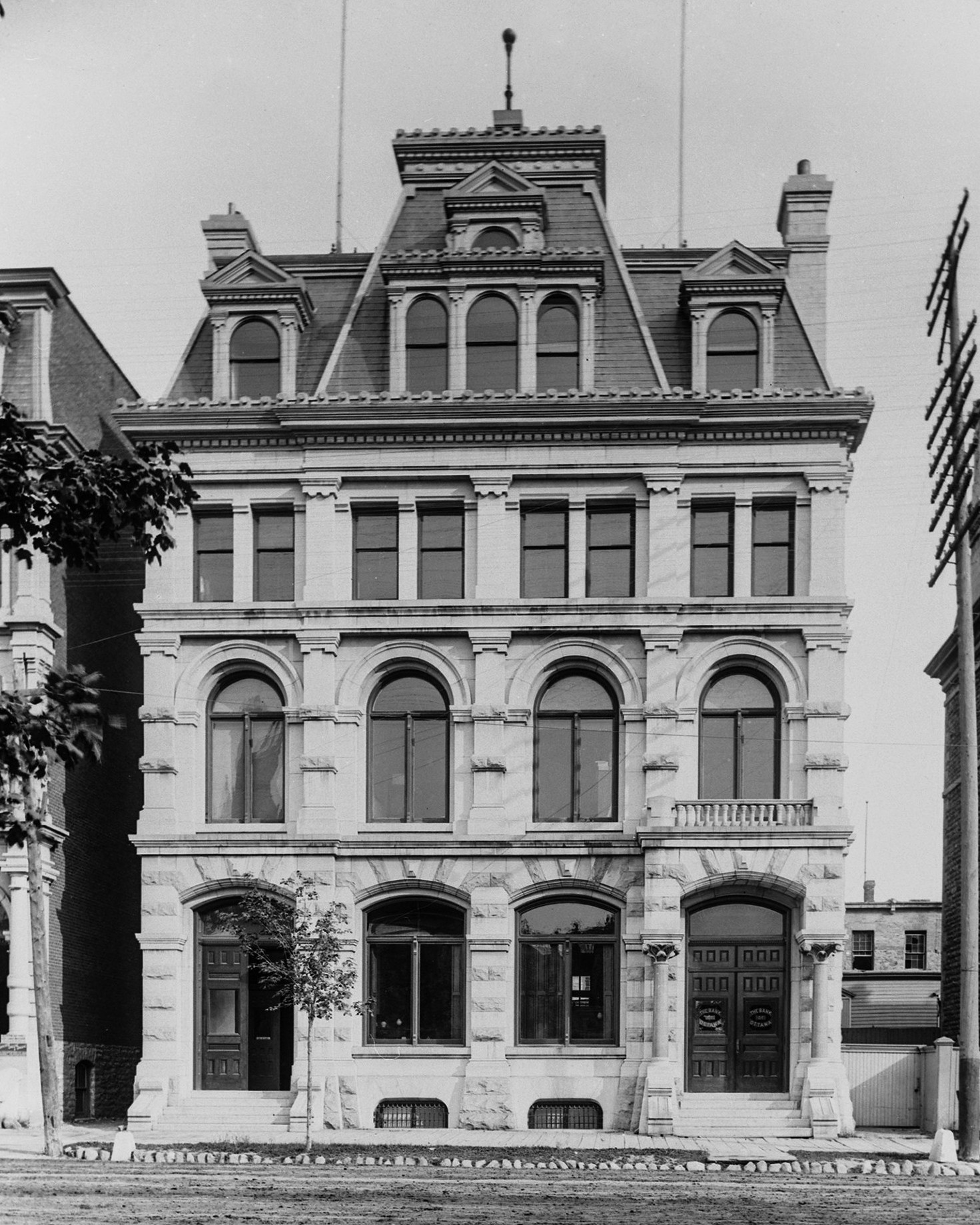
The head office at 116 Wellington Street in Ottawa, designed by George Frederick Stalker

The Bank of Ottawa was established in 1874 by Ottawa Valley lumber pioneers, including James Maclaren, who presided over the Bank from 1874 until his death in 1892. Its head office was on Wellington Street and O'Connor Street (where Victoria Building (Ottawa)) in Ottawa. John Mather served as a bank director from 1879.

Like the other Canadian chartered banks, it issued its own paper money. The bank issued notes 1874-1913. The end dates are the final dates appearing on notes, which circulated for some time after.

The bank expanded beyond the Ottawa area, and by 1918 had branches in six provinces. The Bank of Ottawa, for example, was the first occupant of the building at 169 John Street North in Arnprior, Ontario, and in 1907 a branch was opened in Tisdale. In 1911, the bank's branch in Porcupine, Ontario, was destroyed along with most of the town in a fire.

After World War I the Bank of Ottawa reached a point where it required new capital and vigorous expansion to remain competitive and maintain its earnings. To achieve this, the bank amalgamated with The Bank of Nova Scotia in 1919. Through this merger, The Bank of Nova Scotia acquired a number of new branches as far west as the Pacific Ocean.

== Branches ==
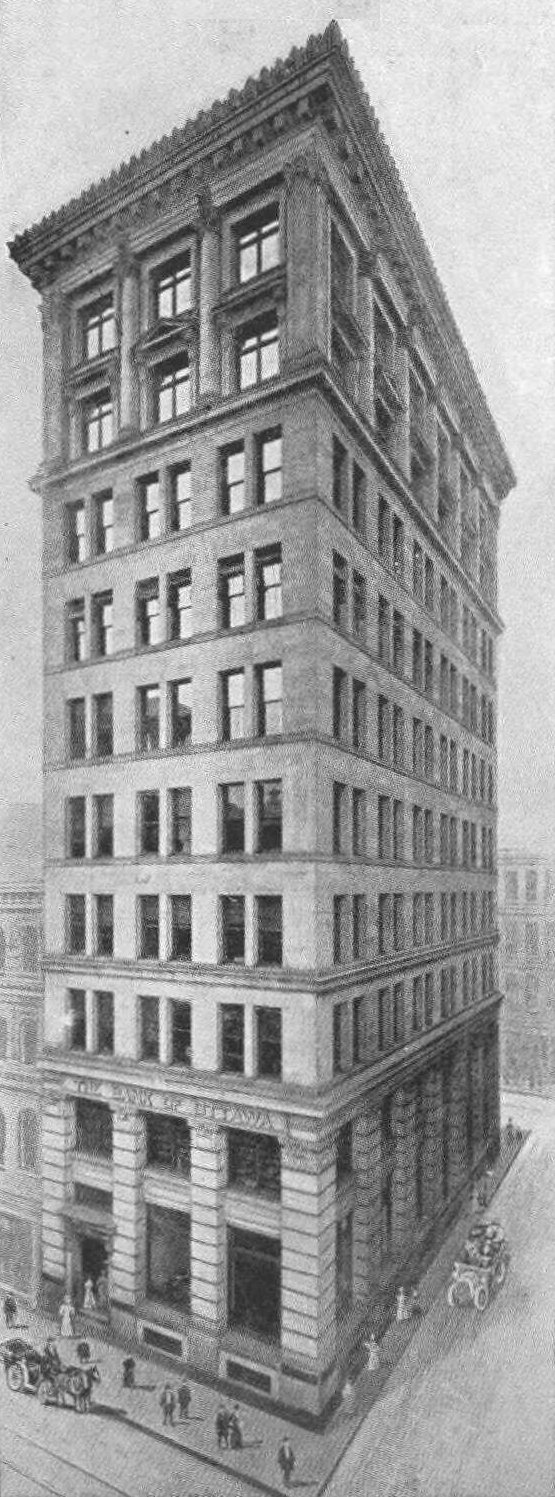
Montreal

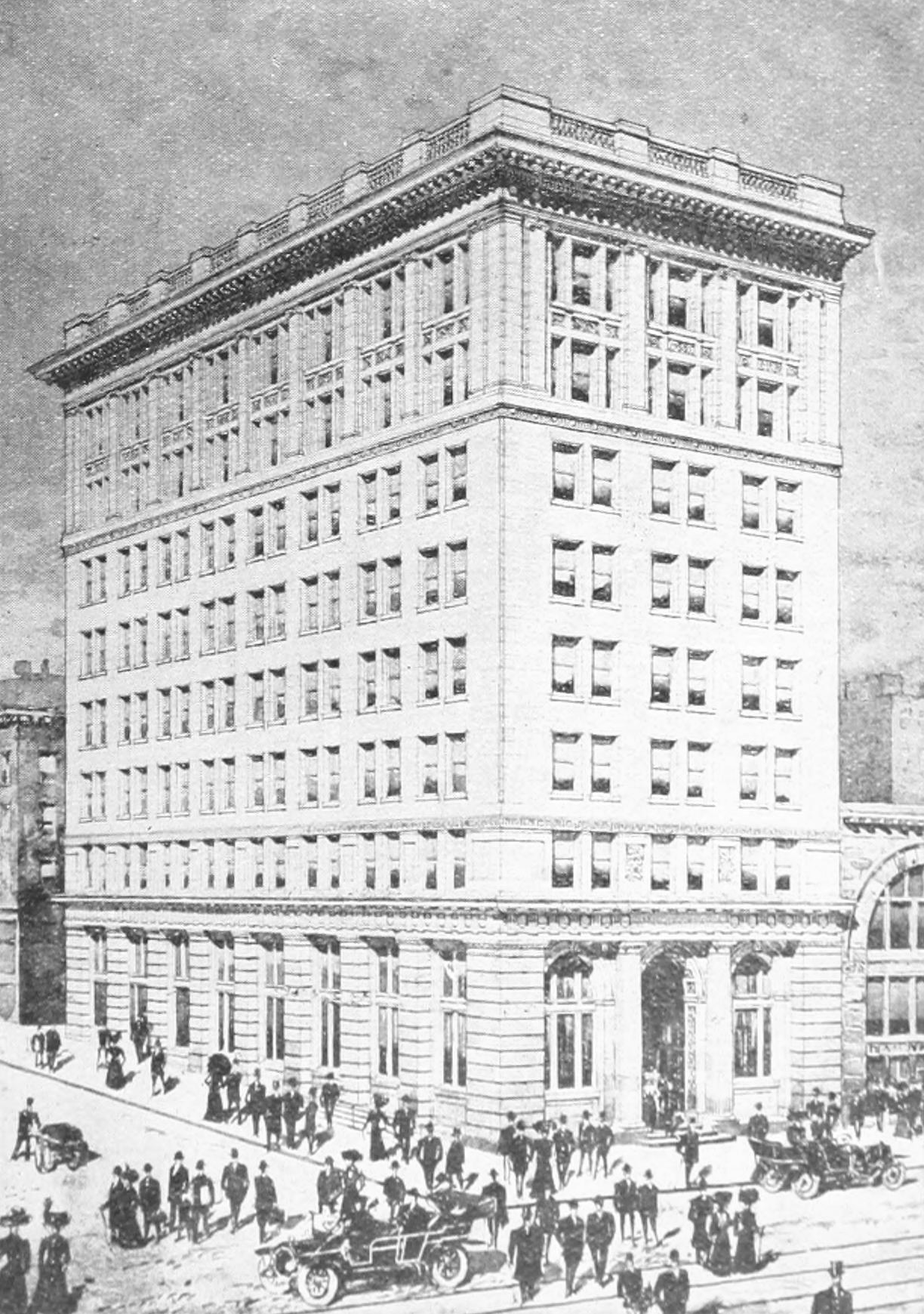
Vancouver

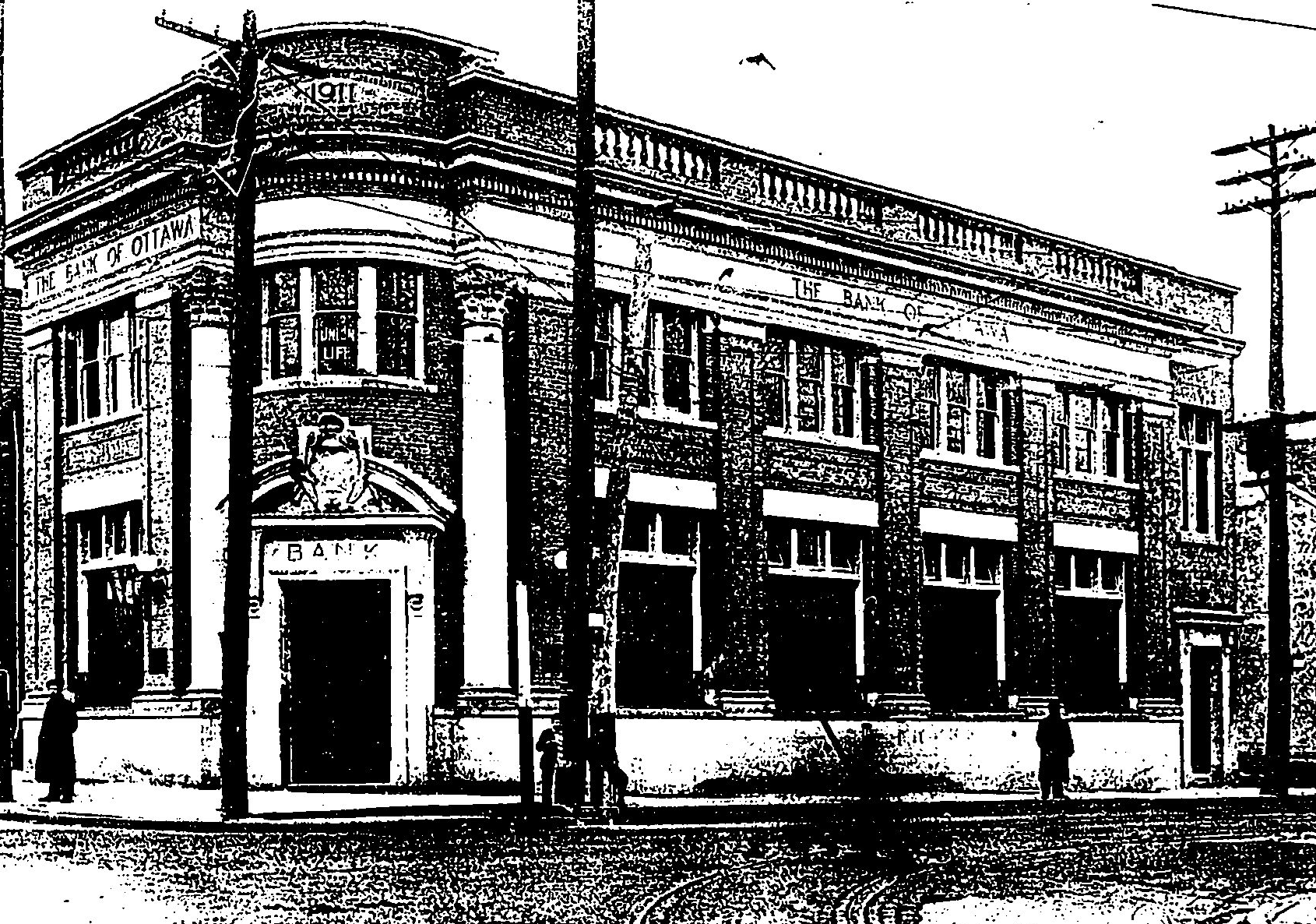
Toronto (Broadview & Gerrard)

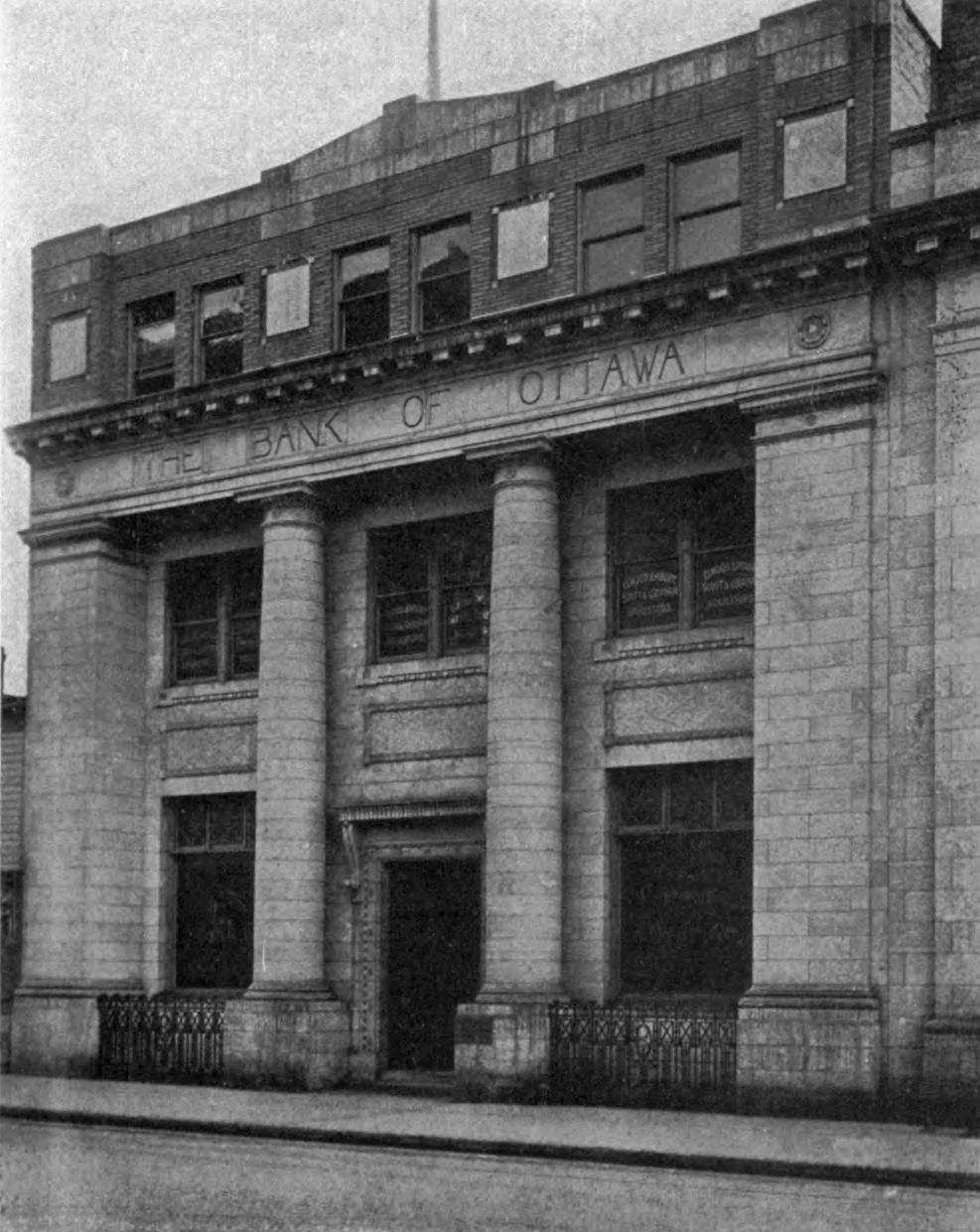
Regina

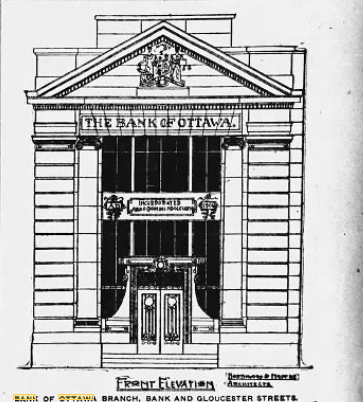
Ottawa (Bank & Gloucester)

== See also ==
- Canadian chartered bank notes
