= Sterling Bank of Canada =

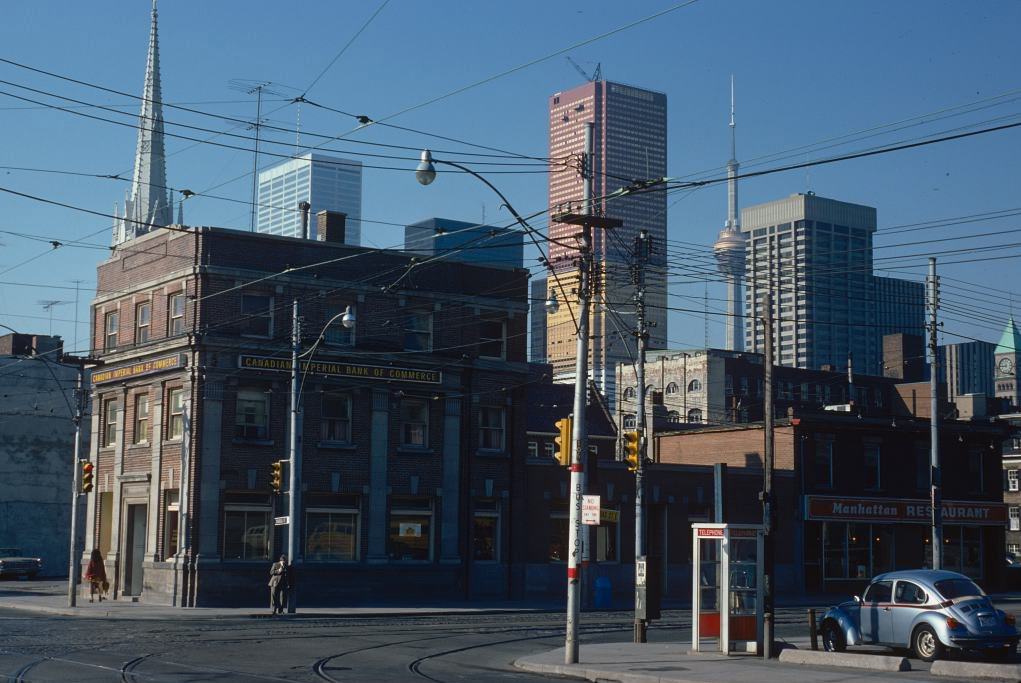
- This branch of the Sterling Bank of Canada was built in 1918 at the SW corner of Church and Dundas streets. In the 21st century it houses a Pizza Pizza branch.
- Founded: 1905; 120 years ago in Toronto, Ontario, Canada
- Defunct: 1924
- Fate: Merged with the Standard Bank of Canada
- Key people: Gabriel T. Somers (president); George B. Woods

The Sterling Bank of Canada was a Canadian bank that was incorporated in 1905 in Toronto, Ontario. The bank was led by Gabriel T. Somers (as President) and George B. Woods, the former would later become the head of the Toronto Board of Trade. It merged with the Standard Bank of Canada in 1924 which, in turn, merged with the Canadian Bank of Commerce in 1928.

== See also ==
- List of Canadian banks
