= Commercial Bank of Manitoba =

The Commercial Bank of Manitoba was incorporated in 1884 and ceased operation in 1893. The president during most of its operation was Duncan MacArthur, a businessman and politician in Manitoba. It experienced financial difficulties throughout most of its years of operation and suspended payment in July 1893 due to heavy withdrawals. It never resumed operation, although it was later found to still be solvent.

A prominent Canadian political figure, Alphonse Alfred Clément Larivière, was one of the directors.

During its brief history, it was a Canadian banknote issuer, and the bills that still survive are collector's items.
