= Bank of Hamilton =

Canadian bank (1872–1923)

- Industry: Banking
- Founded: 14 June 1872
- Defunct: 31 December 1923
- Fate: Merged into the Canadian Bank of Commerce
- Headquarters: 2-6 James Street S, Hamilton, Ontario

The Bank of Hamilton was established in 1872 by local businessmen in the city of Hamilton, Ontario, Canada under the leadership of Donald McInnes, the bank's first President. Like the other Canadian chartered banks, it issued its own paper money. The bank issued notes from 1872 to 1922. The end dates are the final dates appearing on notes, which may have circulated for some time after.

== History ==
The bank had a rough start, including near bankruptcy during the summer of 1879 when six banks in the area had to suspend activities due to financial difficulties. On August 1, 1879, the bank would run into further difficulties when its headquarters burned down; however, the bank would go on to thrive.

On July 29, 1896 the Bank of Hamilton's first Winnipeg branch opened. By December 1898, six more branches were opened in Manitoba. This marked the beginning of two decades of explosive growth in the West. In total, between 1898 and 1910, the Bank of Hamilton would go on to open 128 branches throughout Ontario and Western Canada. By 1928, this number had grown to 152 branches.

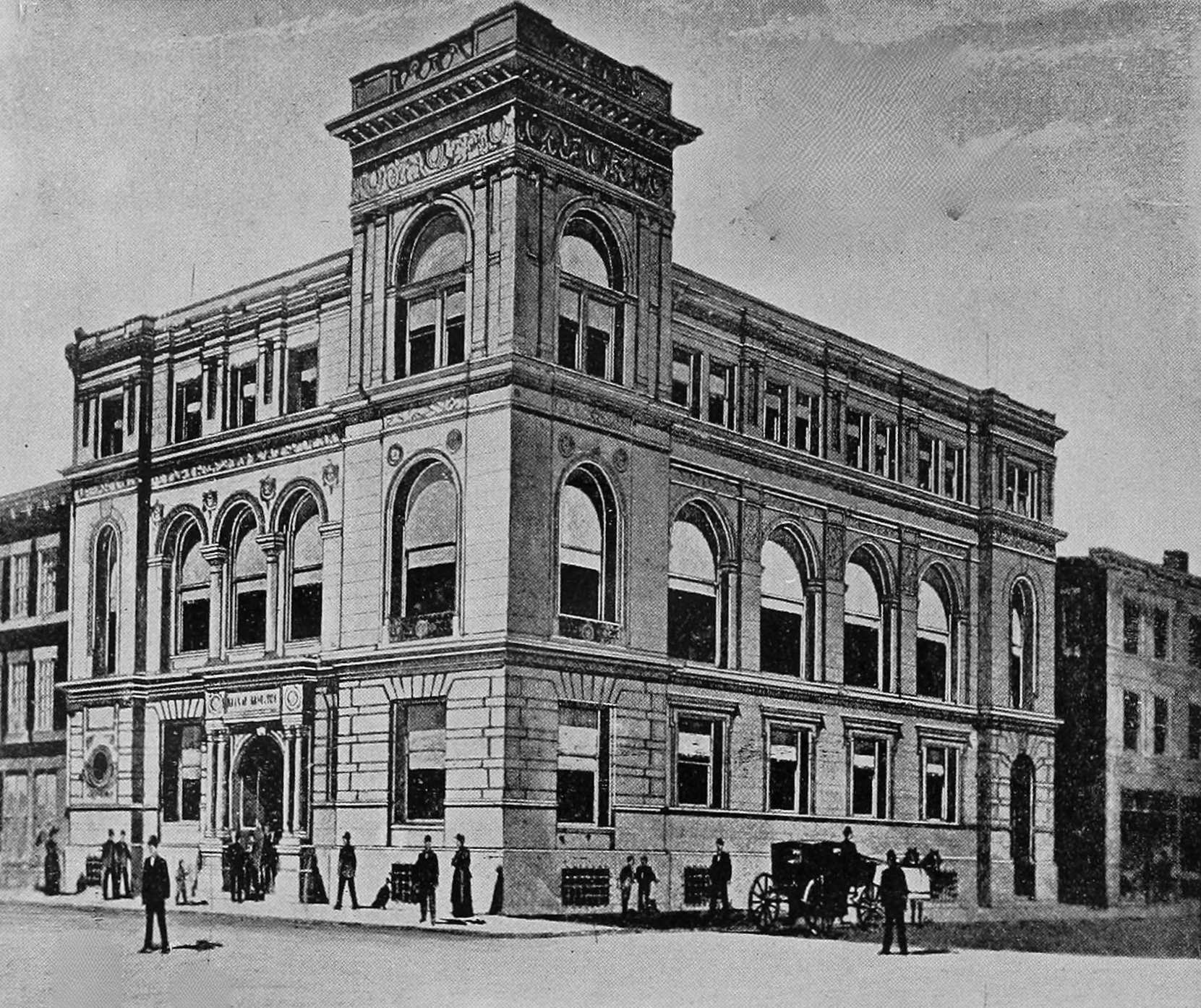
The bank's 1890 headquarters designed by Richard Alfred Waite

Like the other Canadian chartered banks, it issued its own paper money. The Bank of Canada was established through the Bank of Canada Act of 1934 and the banks relinquished their right to issue their own currency.

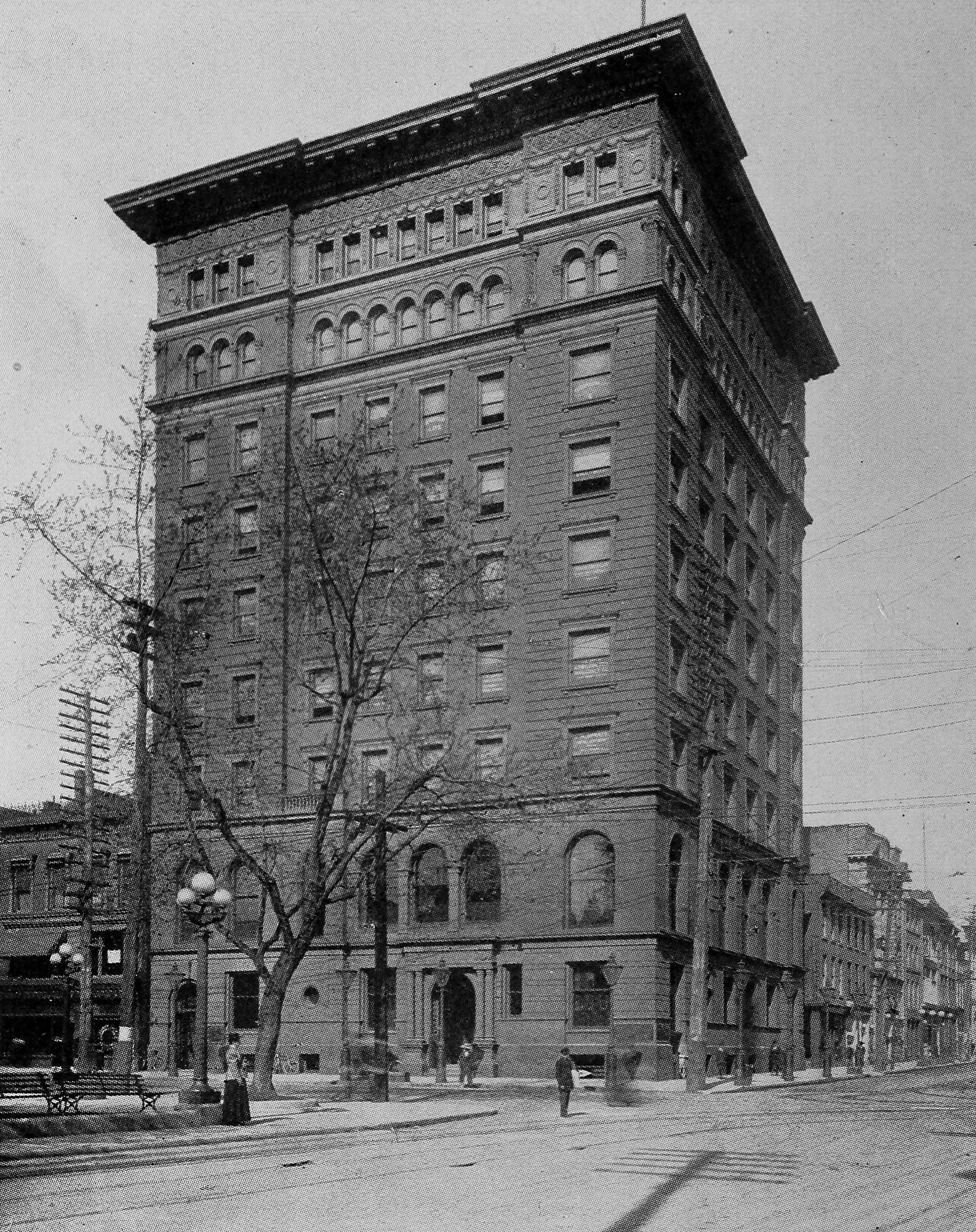
The headquarters after the addition in 1905 of six floors, designed by Charles Mills. The building was demolished in 1982.

By 1905 the bank was doing so well that it decided to expand its head office, adding on an additional 8 storeys. This is significant because the bank headquarters became Hamilton's first skyscraper on the corner of King and James Street. This tall building attracted the attention of Harry H. Gardiner of Washington, known as the Human Fly. He climbed the Bank of Hamilton building on November 11, 1918, to celebrate the end of World War I.

The Bank of Hamilton operated an ice hockey team in the Winnipeg Bankers' League, which included its local employees and was coached by branch manager H. J. Sterling.

The Bank of Hamilton merged with the Canadian Bank of Commerce (later to become the Canadian Imperial Bank of Commerce, or CIBC) on January 2, 1924. It was one of the last surviving banks in Canada that was not headquartered in Toronto or Montreal.

Thirty-five members of the Bank of Hamilton from branches across Canada died as a result of their World War I service. Their names were listed on a bronze memorial plaque which is currently displayed at the former Bank of Montreal (1928) building in Hamilton, Ontario.

== Architecture ==
A number of buildings constructed for, or used by, the Bank of Hamilton are on the Registry of Historical Places of Canada.

- The Bank of Hamilton in Winnipeg, Manitoba, built 1916 to 1918
- The Bank of Hamilton in Salmon Arm, BC, built in 1906.
- The Bank of Hamilton Chambers in North Vancouver (city), BC, built in 1910-1911.
- The Canadian Imperial Bank of Commerce (CIBC) Kitchener, Ontario location on King Street East was built in 1885. It was occupied by the Bank of Hamilton from 1893 until CIBC took over the Bank of Hamilton in 1927.
- The 1893 Thomson Brothers Block in Calgary, Alberta was owned by the Bank of Hamilton from 1916 to 1927.

== See also ==
- Canadian chartered bank notes
