= Bank of Acadia =

Defunct Canadian bank

The Bank of Acadia was a Canadian bank operating in Liverpool, Nova Scotia, from December 1872 to 28 March 1873. Surviving only three months and 26 days, it had the shortest lifespan of any bank in Canadian history.

== History ==
The Bank of Acadia was chartered on 14 June 1872, and opened in December of that year with Thomas Roberts Pattillo as President and G. E. Stevens as the cashier. (Note: The position of cashier would be equivalent to general manager.) Pattillo, a successful merchant of Liverpool who owned several square-rigged sailing ships, started the bank in the wake of the foundation of the Bank of Liverpool in November 1871.

In the years following Confederation, the value of wooden sailing ships was falling rapidly, and shipbuilders in Liverpool were borrowing large sums of money from the Bank of Liverpool. As a result, Pattillo opposed providing loans to shipbuilders from the Bank of Acadia, but was outvoted by the cashier and directors. The bank thus provided a sizeable loan to Collie & Spencer, a Liverpool shipbuilding company, in early 1873. Collie & Spencer entered bankruptcy soon after receiving the loan.

The Bank of Acadia failed on 28 March 1873, after only three months and 26 days. It had the shortest lifespan of any bank in Canadian history. The bank reopened a few days after closing and redeemed some of its banknotes, worth a few thousand dollars. It was officially suspended in April. Any remaining banknotes after this point were unable to be redeemed, with the exception of those held by the government, which were redeemed for 25 cents to the dollar. At the date of suspension, the bank held total assets amounting to $213,346 (Note: (equivalent to $6,672,000 in 2023)) and total liabilities of $106,914. (Note: (equivalent to $3,344,000 in 2023)) Pattillo suffered a heart attack following the failure of the bank, and died on 10 February 1874.

== Banknotes ==
The Bank of Acadia produced banknotes in the denominations of 20 dollars, 10 dollars, five dollars, and four dollars. The banknotes were printed by the British American Bank Note Company, and are dated 2 December 1872.

== See also ==
- Halifax Banking Company – first bank in Nova Scotia
