= Standard Bank of Canada =

Canadian bank (1872–1928)

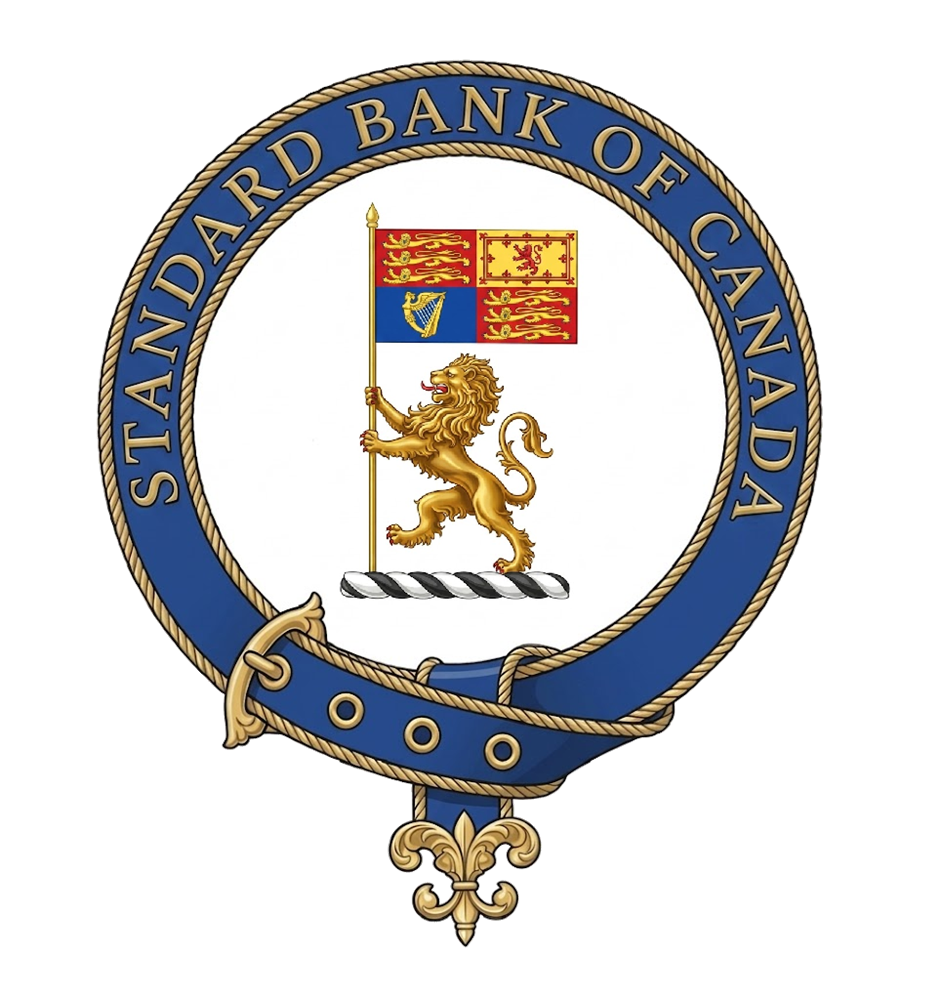
- Formerly: St. Lawrence Bank (1872–76)
- Industry: Banking
- Founded: 14 June 1872
- Defunct: 1928
- Fate: Acquired by the Canadian Bank of Commerce
- Headquarters: 15 King Street West, Toronto, Ontario
- Key people: First President: John Charles Fitch

The Standard Bank of Canada was a Canadian bank established in 1872 as the St. Lawrence Bank by a group of Toronto businessmen led by John Charles Fitch.

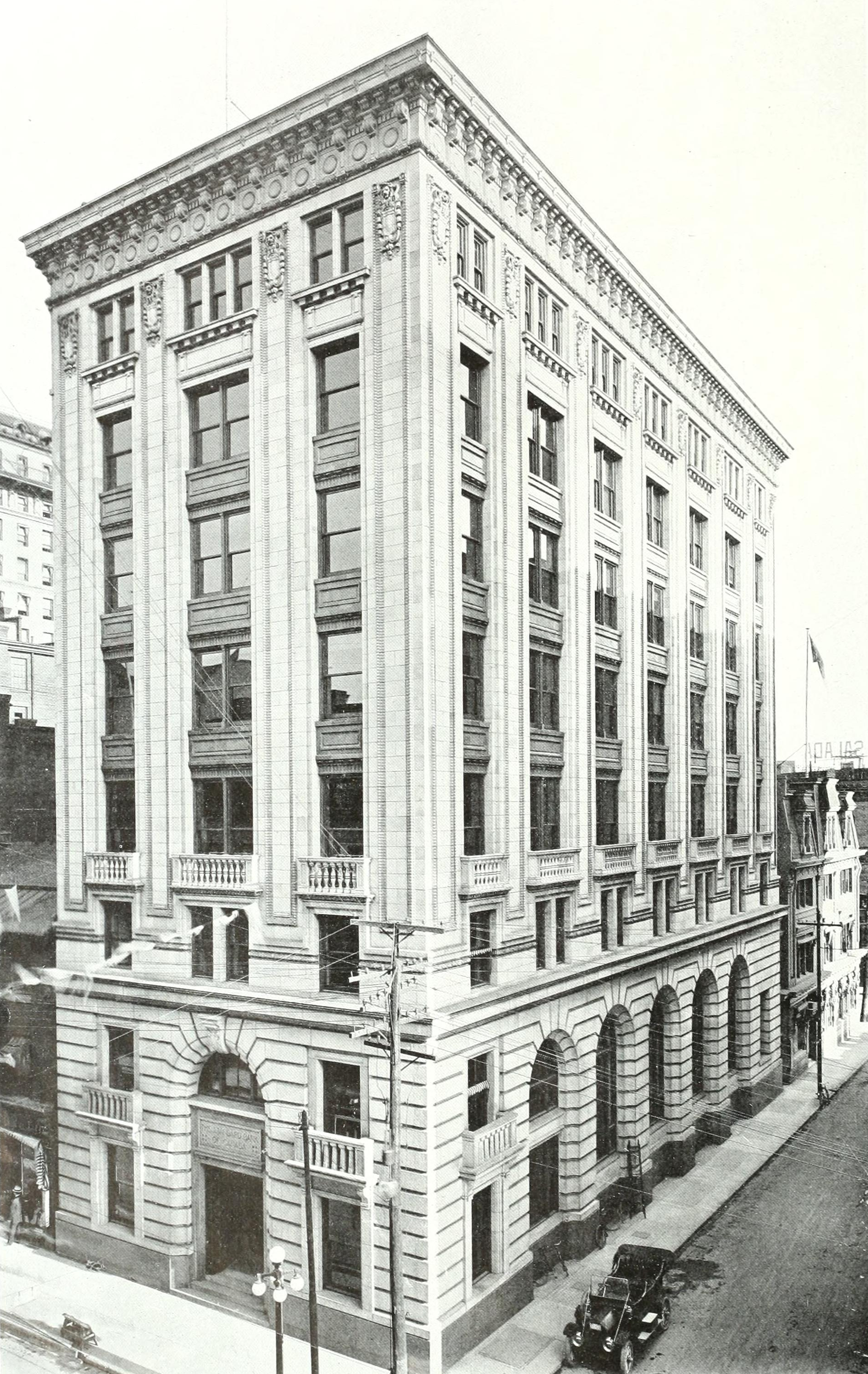
The 1909 Standard Bank Building at 15 King Street West in Toronto, designed by Darling and Pearson. It was demolished in 1965.

In 1876 it was renamed the Standard Bank of Canada following a reorganization, and under its new management it grew, part of a broader pattern in which Canada's branch-banking system produced greater stability than the fragmented, unit-banking model then prevailing in the United States. By 1907 it had nearly 50 branches and added another 27 when Standard Bank acquired the Western Bank of Canada (1882-1909), a regional bank headquartered in Oshawa, Ontario. The bank began to expand into the western provinces, and later combined with the Sterling Bank in 1924. The combined entity had 243 branches, of which 176 were in Ontario. Increased competition and other strategic considerations led to the Standard Bank of Canada to merge with the Canadian Bank of Commerce in 1928.

The Standard Bank of Canada issued its own banknotes, as many of Canada's banks did in that era. Some examples of these notes can be seen at the Bank of Canada's Currency Museum.

== Gallery of Branches ==
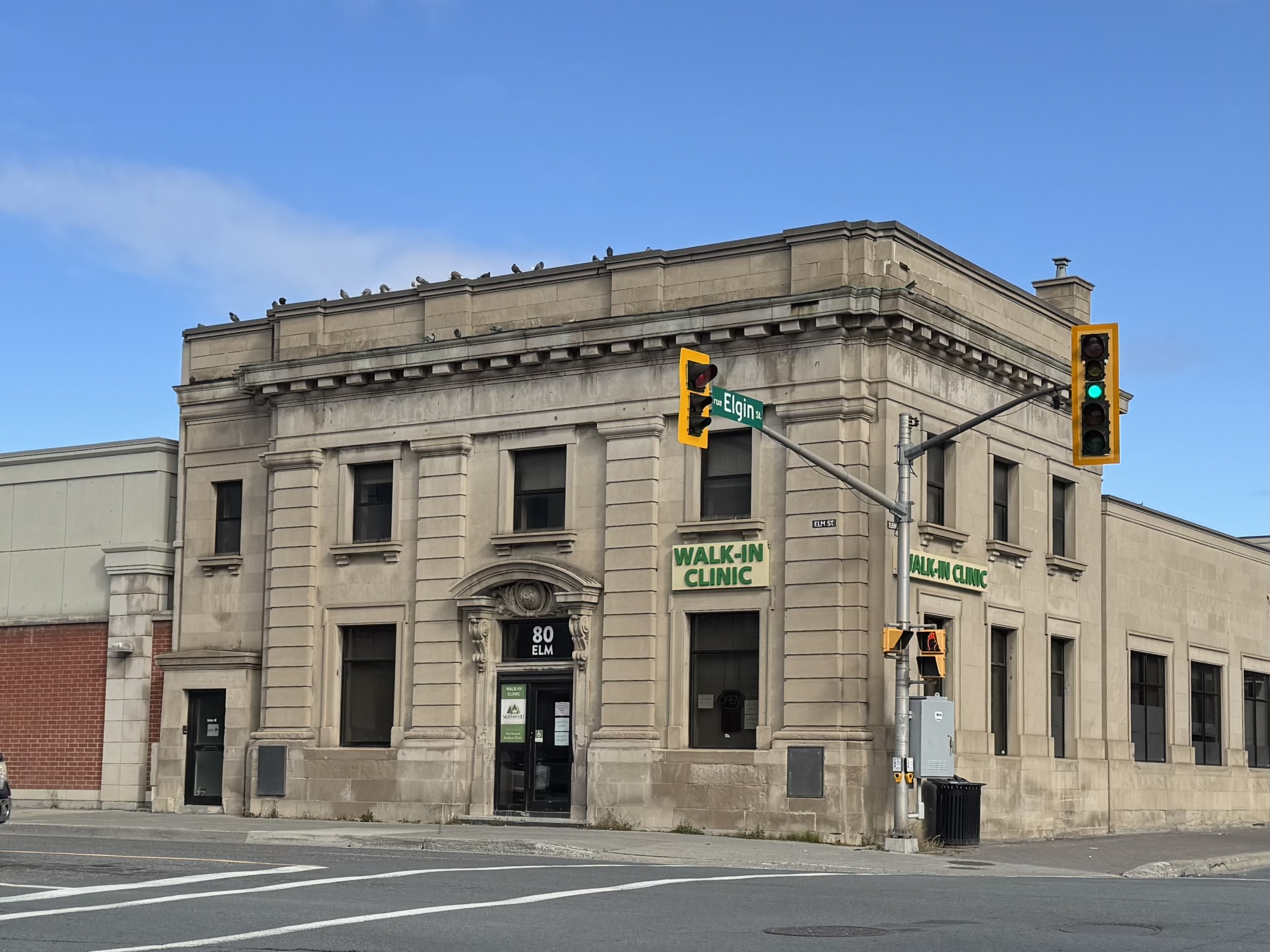
Sudbury

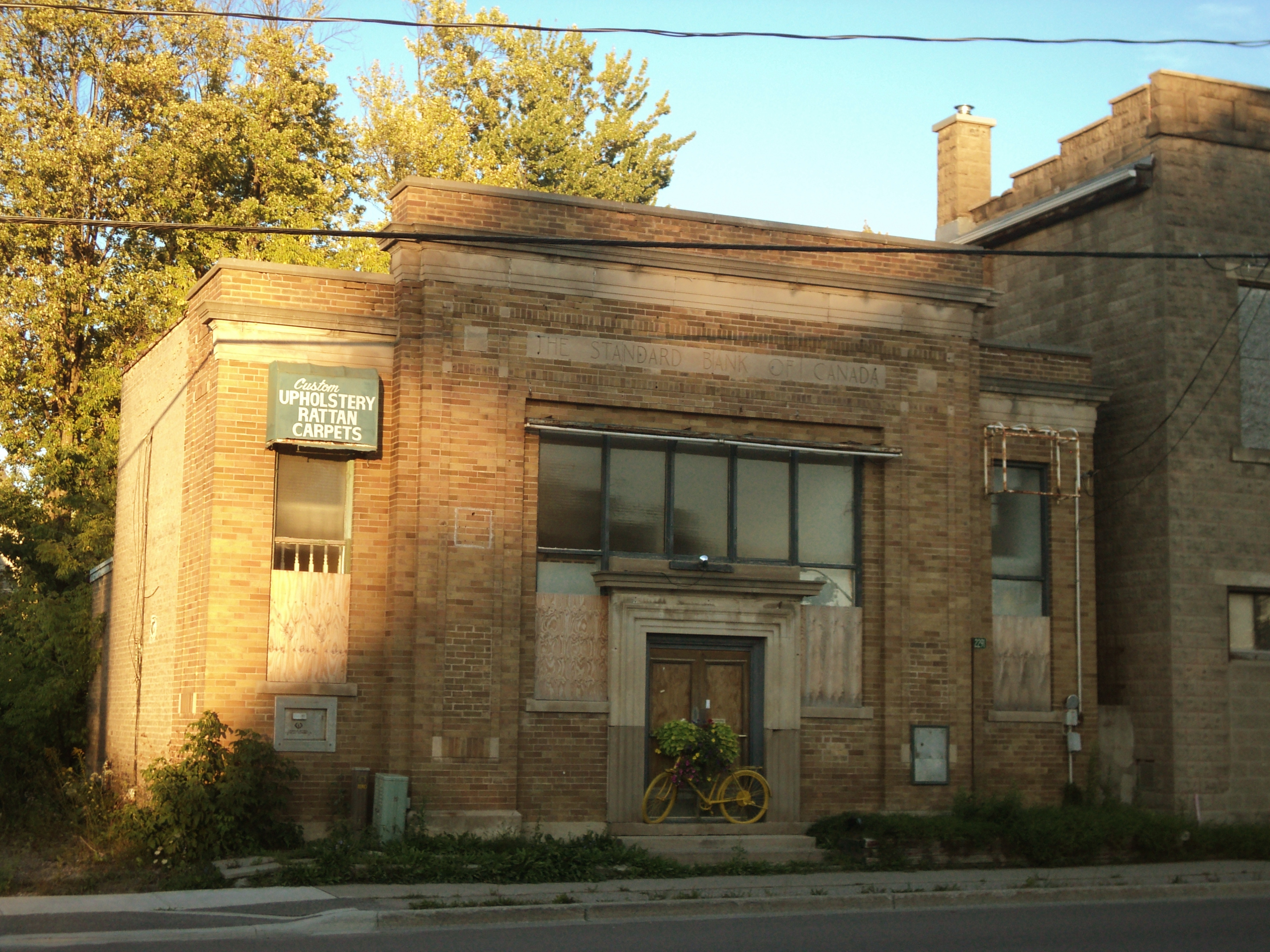
Brechin

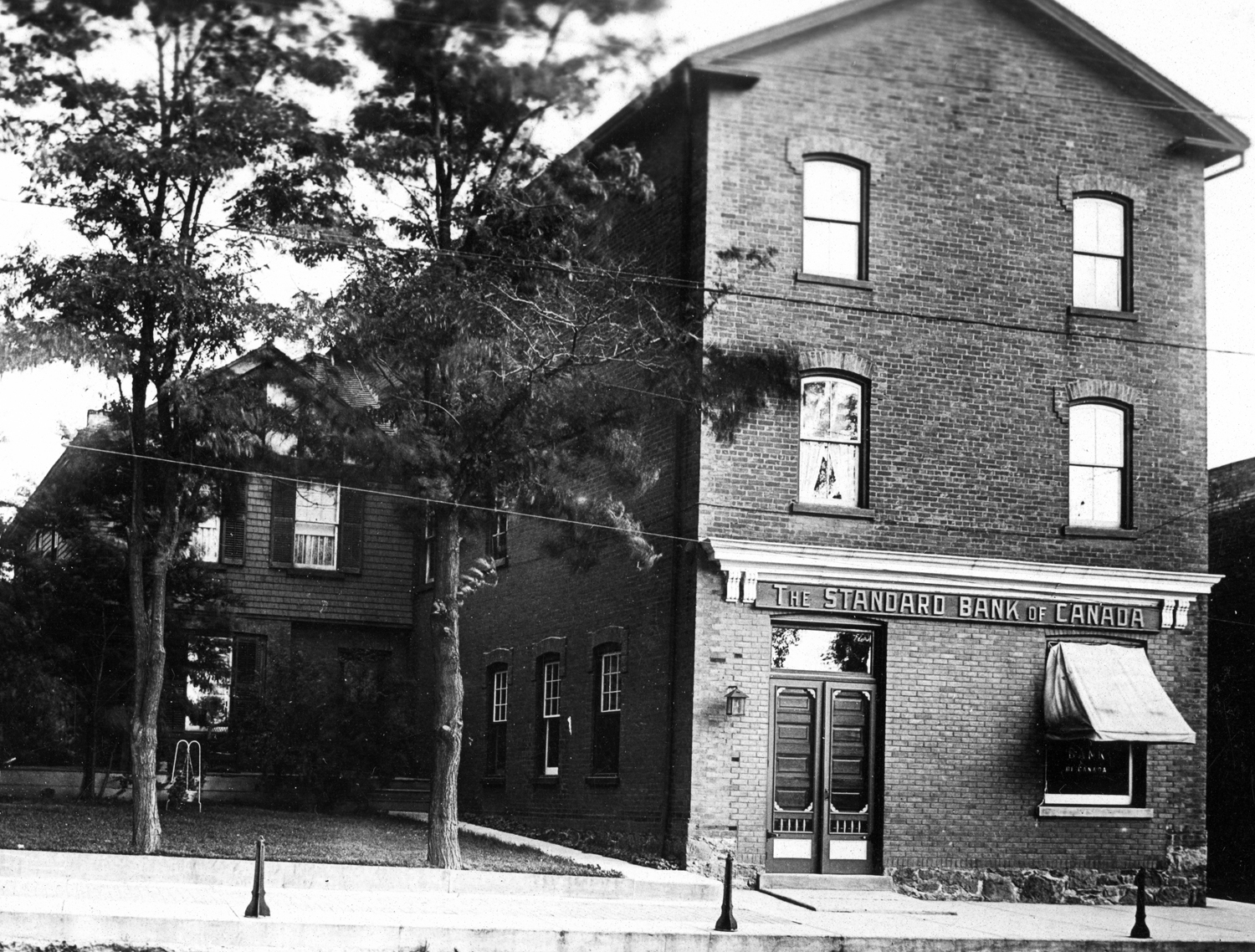
Markham

== See also ==
- List of banks and credit unions in Canada
