= Canada Life =

Canadian financial services and insurance company

Coordinates: 49.8838°N 97.1496°W

The Canada Life Assurance Company
- Type: Subsidiary
- Industry: Financial services and insurance
- Founded: 1847; 179 years ago
- Founder: Hugh Cossart Baker Sr.
- Headquarters: Toronto, Ontario
- Key people: David Harney (President and CEO); R. Jeffrey Orr (Chair)
- AUM: ▲CA$505.63 billion (2025)
- Total assets: ▲CA$503.92 billion (2025)
- Number of employees: 13,400 (2025)
- Parent: Great-West Lifeco
- Subsidiaries: Irish Life
- Website: www.canadalife.com

The Canada Life Assurance Company (French: La Compagnie d'Assurance du Canada sur la Vie), commonly known as Canada Life (Canada-Vie), is a Canadian insurance and financial services company with its headquarters in Winnipeg, Manitoba. The current company is the result of the 2020 amalgamation of The Great-West Life Assurance Company, London Life Insurance Company and The Canada Life Assurance Company, along with their holding companies (London Insurance Group Inc. and Canada Life Financial Corporation). The company is a wholly owned subsidiary of Great-West Lifeco.

== History and ownership ==
=== Great-West Life Assurance Company ===

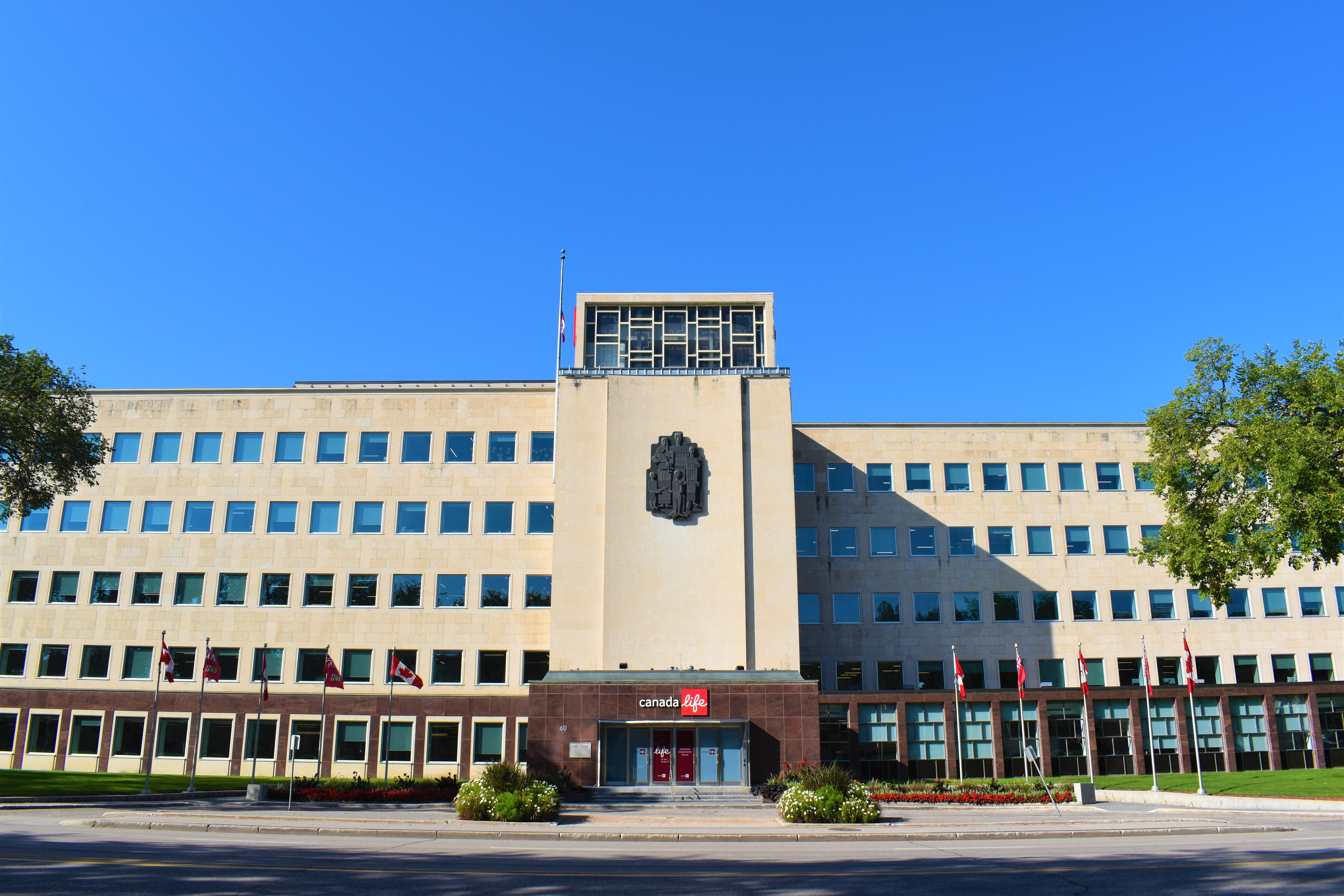
Canada Life Building in Winnipeg on Osborne St. North.

The Great-West Life Assurance Company (French: La Great-West, Compagnie d'Assurance-vie) provided life, disability, and health insurance; benefit and retirement plans; and investment advice. It was active in both the United States and Canada.

Great-West Life was founded in Winnipeg in 1891 by Jeffry Hall Brock, a local insurance agent. The company was incorporated on August 28, 1891, with local residents such as James Ashdown on its board. In 1942, it was the first Canadian company "to enter the accident and health insurance business." In 1960, the company moved to Osborne Street, where it had constructed a new building on the site of the old Osborne Stadium. In 1983, the company expanded into a building on the corner of Broadway and Osborne.

In 1979, US and Canadian operations were separated due mostly to rapid US growth. In 1969, Great-West was purchased by the Power Corporation, which made it into a wholly owned subsidiary. In 1982, Great-West began offering a universal life policy which differed from those offered by competitors. Two years later, in 1984, the Power Financial Corporation was created as a holding company for Great-West and its numerous businesses.

Great-West Life Realty (GWL Realty) is the Toronto-based property and asset management arm of Great-West Life, established in 1993.

=== London Life Insurance Company ===
The London Life Insurance Company (or London Life) merged with Great-West Life in 1997, then joined the original Canada Life in 2003. London Life was a part of Great-West Lifeco subsidiary, Great-West Life Assurance Company. London Life was founded in London, Ontario, in 1874, and remains headquartered there. In 2009, London Life ranked 14th among Canada's largest private companies. The company reportedly had assets under management of $40 billion (Canadian funds) as at December 31, 2004, and 1.9 million participating life insurance policies.

London Life was best known for its widely advertised Freedom 55 program launched in 1984, which evokes saving money to an extent that would allow one to retire at age 55 instead of age 65, the standard retirement age under the Canada Pension Plan. The tagline was later repurposed for the company's sales organization, which was rebranded Freedom 55 Financial in 2000.

In 2019, London Life merged with its sister companies, Great-West Life Assurance Company and Canada Life Financial, under the banner of Canada Life. The Freedom 55 Financial brand was also retired at this point.

=== Canada Life Financial Corporation ===

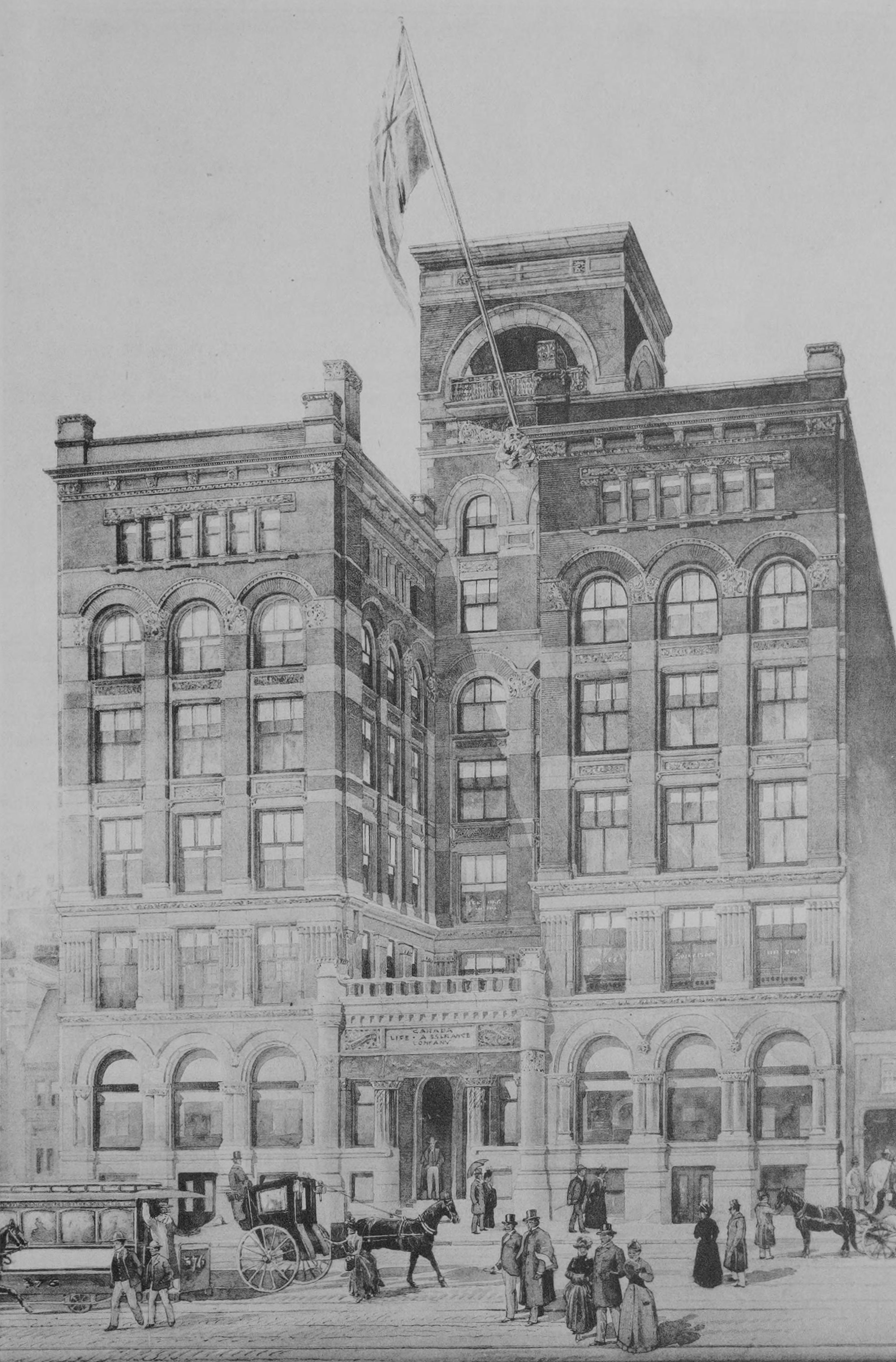
The 1887 office in Toronto designed by Richard Alfred Waite. In 1899 it became the head office.

Hugh Cossart Baker Sr. established the Canada Life Assurance Company (CLAC), the first life insurance company in Canada, on 21 August 1847. The firm was incorporated in 1849.

The company was acquired by Great-West Life Assurance Company in 2003, after rejecting a hostile takeover bid by rival Manulife. Canada Life Financial had offices in the United Kingdom; in Ireland; Germany; Brazil; the United States; and on the Isle of Man.

The first CLAC head office was in Hamilton, Ontario on the top floor of the Mechanics' Institute on James Street near Merrick, where the Hamilton City Centre (formerly the Eaton's Centre) now stands. The head office moved in 1883 to King Street East and Hughson Street South (later known as the Birks Building). The company commissioned the building of the Canada Life Building, which was completed in 1895, in Montreal. The headquarters of CLAC was moved to Toronto in 1900 by newly installed company president George Cox. From 1926 to 1929, the company was headquartered at historic Cawthra House in Toronto.

Several acquisitions were made and sister companies founded through the years, including:

Crown Life Insurance Company of Canada

Crown Life was founded in 1900 and was based in Toronto. It was acquired by CLAC in 1998.

Canada Life, UK

Canada Life began operations in the United Kingdom in 1903. Chesnara acquired the UK bonds and legacy pensions business of Canada Life in December 2024.

== Parent companies ==
Great-West Lifeco is a joint-stock corporation traded on the Toronto Stock Exchange and owns 100% of The Great-West Life Assurance Company. Power Financial Corporation (PFC) is the majority stake-holder and owns 72% of Great-West Lifeco, the only one of those finance companies to be a member of the stock exchange composite index. Other operating companies include Irish Life, Great-West Financial, and Putnam Investments.

In 2003, Great-West Lifeco acquired Canada Life Financial, which later emerged, along with Great-West Life Assurance Company, for US$4.7 billion. Great-West Life sold its health insurance US division to Cigna for US$1.5 billion in a deal announced on November 26, 2007. Great-West was seeking to expand into the western United States.

== Merger and consolidation ==
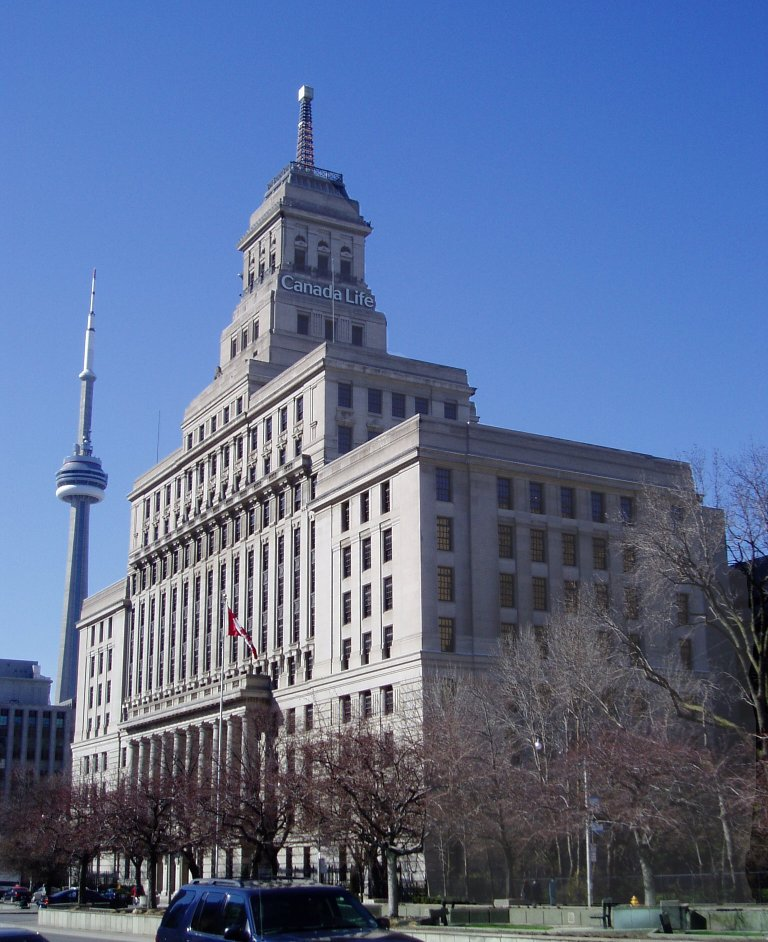
The Canada Life Building in Toronto, 2005

In 2019, Great-West Lifeco consolidated its three brands in Canada as "Canada Life". In April 2019, Great-West Life merged with its sister companies London Life and Canada Life into the single brand of Canada Life. The rebrand took place in 2020, with Canada Life having 10,500 employees. The Canada Life amalgamation received approval from the Canadian government in November 2019. They officially begin operating as The Canada Life Assurance Company on January 1, 2020. Canada Life is based in Toronto, Ontario at the historic Canada Life Building on University Avenue.

Employees of the merged companies work from five regional offices in Winnipeg, London, Toronto, Montreal and Regina. Paul A. Mahon is president. Canada Life is on the Canada's Top 100 Employers and Top 100 Employers for Young people lists.

== Philanthropy ==
On May 28, 2017, sister companies Canada Life, London Life and Great-West Life contributed $25,000 to Canadian Red Cross to help people affected by extensive Spring flooding in Canada.

In May 2017, Canada Life (then Great-West Life), along with the Investors Group and the Power Corporation of Canada, announced a commitment of $12 million to the University of Manitoba to establish an Institute for Leadership Development.

In February 2020, the corporation established the "James W. Burns 'Founder Endowment Fund' " after the late James W. Burns, former president and chief executive officer at Great-West Life.

In April 2019, the Manitoba Museum announced a donation of $750,000.00 to their capital campaign, "Bringing Our Stories Forward", by Canada Life. The donation was made in honour of Burns.

Canada Life donated 470 tickets for the "A Conversation with Michelle Obama" event to the Winnipeg School Division.

The company has been a long-term sponsor of "Future Leaders of Manitoba" awards. Notable recipients of the award have included indigenous Peoples activist Michael Redhead Champagne, Canadian politician Kevin Chief, Canadian film director Adam Smoluk, community leader Hannah Pratt, surgeon and university associate professor Dr. Jordan Hochman, president of Manitoba SwimAbility, Cameron Krisko, and young philanthropist Ben Sabic.

== Legal proceedings ==
Canada Life–UK claimed its former employee, Domenico Iacono, had illegally removed confidential information after he quit the job. The insurance group brought legal proceedings against Iacono before the High Court.

Canada Life Financial was sued by Vanessa Valentyne after refusing to pay out her missing son's insurance policy. The policy he took out had an exclusionary clause, according to which the company will not pay on a policy if death is a result of its holder's criminal activity. Valentyne's son was a drug dealer for six years before his January 7, 2013 disappearance from a drug dealing house.

== Leadership ==
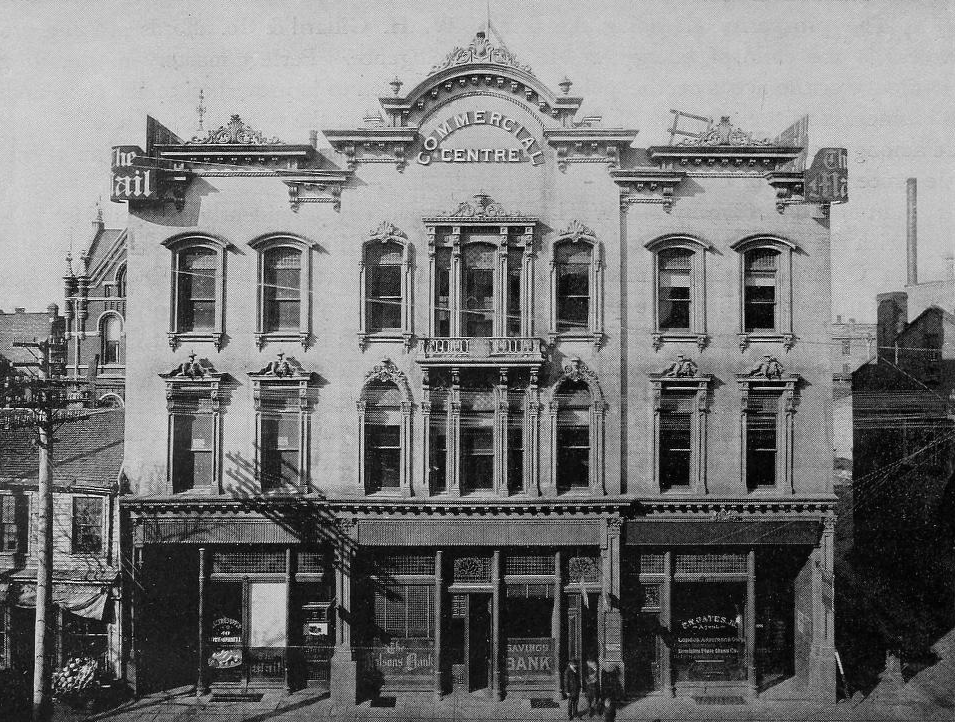
Canada Life constructed its first office in Hamilton in 1855, designed by Sage & Barger of Buffalo. It was demolished in 1928 to make way for the Pigott Building.

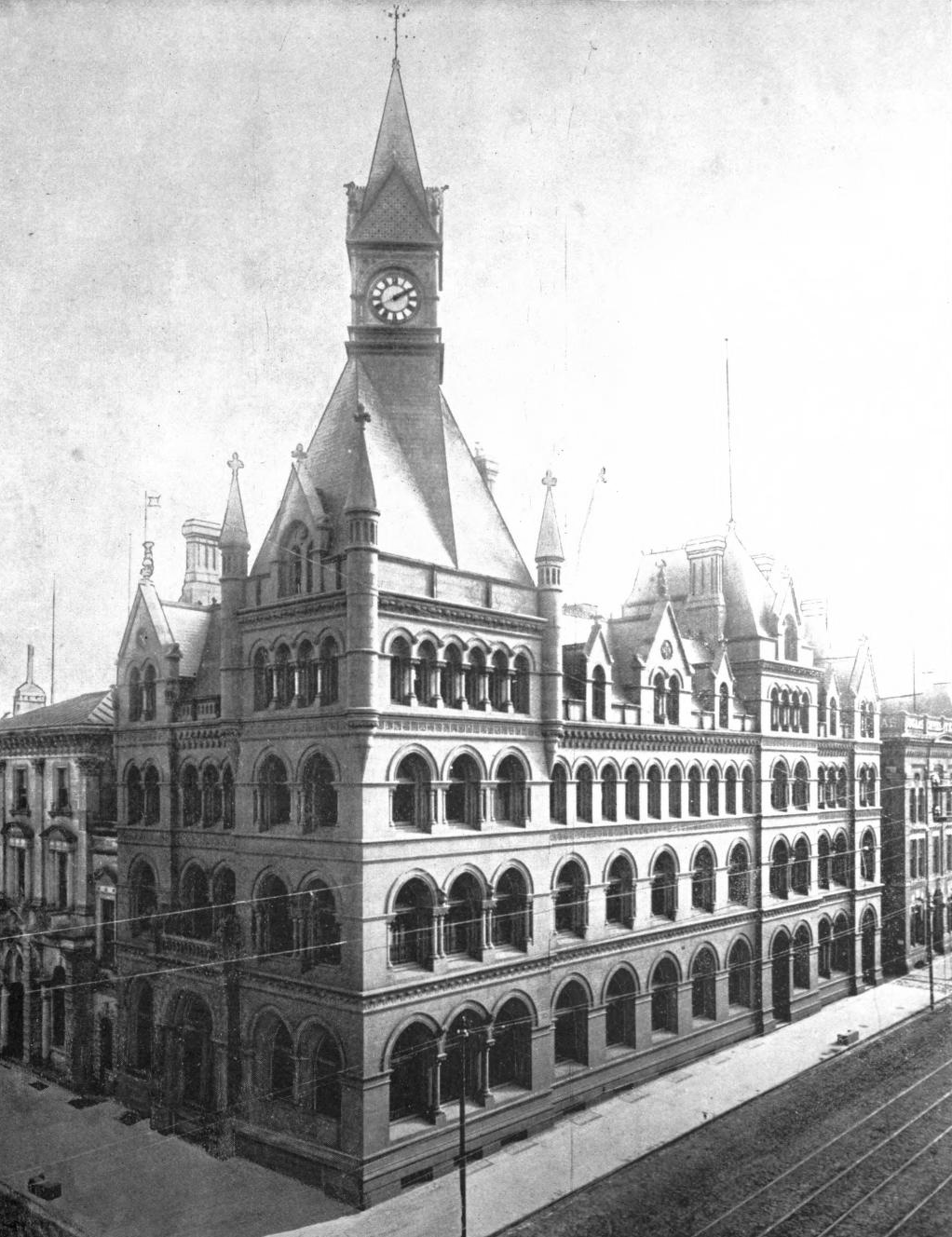
The company's 1880 headquarters building in Hamilton, designed by Richard Alfred Waite. It was demolished in 1972.

=== President ===
1. Hugh Cossart Baker Sr., 1847–1859
2. John Young, 1859–1873
3. Edward Cartwright Thomas, 1873–1875
4. Alexander Gillespie Ramsay, 1875–1899
5. George Albertus Cox, 1900–1914
6. Edward William Cox, 1914
7. Herbert Coplin Cox, 1914–1928
8. Leighton Goldie McCarthy, 1928–1938
9. Alfred Newton Mitchell, 1938–1946
10. St Clair William McEvenue, 1946–1948
11. Edwin George Baker, 1948–1951
12. Ernest Clark Gill, 1951–1964
13. Allan Hazlett Lemmon, 1964–1973
14. Edward Hamon Crawford, 1973–1988
15. David Alexander Nield, 1988–2002
16. William Lawrence Acton, 2002–2003
17. Raymond Lindsay McFeetors, 2003–2008
18. David Allen Loney, 2008–2013
19. Paul Anthony Mahon, 2013–2025
20. David Martin Harney, 2025–

=== Chairman of the Board ===
1. Herbert Coplin Cox, 1928–1938
2. Leighton Goldie McCarthy, 1938–1946
3. Alfred Newton Mitchell, 1946–1951
4. Edwin George Baker, 1951–1961
5. Graham Ford Towers, 1961–1969
6. John Girdlestone Hungerford, 1969–1973
7. Allan Hazlett Lemmon, 1973–1981
8. David Waddell Barr, 1981–1986
9. Edward Hamon Crawford, 1986–1998
10. David Alexander Nield, 1998–2003
11. Robert Gratton, 2003–2008
12. Raymond Lindsay McFeetors, 2008–2013
13. Robert Jeffrey Orr, 2013–present

== See also ==
- List of United States insurance companies
- List of Canadian insurance companies
