= Power Financial =

Canadian diversified management and holding company

Power Financial Corporation
- Type: Subsidiary
- Industry: Conglomerate
- Founded: 1984
- Headquarters: Montreal, Quebec
- Products: Financial services, insurance
- Net income: $1,964 billion (2019)
- AUM: $968 billion (2022)
- Number of employees: Approx. 28,400 employees (December 31, 2019)
- Parent: Power Corporation of Canada
- Subsidiaries: Great-West Lifeco; Canada Life; PanAgora Asset Management; Mackenzie Investments
- Website: PowerFinancial.com

Power Financial Corporation is a Canadian multinational company that was founded in 1984. Power Financial, a wholly owned subsidiary of Power Corporation of Canada, is an international management and holding company with interests in financial services and asset management businesses in Canada, the United States and Europe. It also has significant holdings in a portfolio of global companies based in Europe.

Power Financial, together with IGM financial and Great-West Lifeco, are anchor investors in funds managed by an affiliate, Portag3 Ventures, which operates investment funds dedicated to backing financial services companies. To date, Portag3 Ventures has invested in more than 45 fintech companies and investment funds. Portag3, Power Financial and IGM Financial also hold interests in Wealthsimple, one of Canada’s leading financial technology companies, operating one of the country's largest and fastest-growing digital investing service.

== History ==
Power Financial Corporation has interests in companies in the financial services sector in Canada, the United States and Europe. While its parent company Power Corporation was originally established as an electric utility holding company, the company became a conglomerate with major interests in the finance industry.

Founded in 1984 with the ambition of creating an integrated financial services group, Power Financial has remained committed to the growth and evolution of its primary holdings through its controlling interests in Great West Lifeco and IGM. Power Financial also has significant holdings in a portfolio of global companies based in Europe through its investment in Pargesa.

The Nesbitt family sold most of their interest in Power Corporation to the Paul Desmarais group in 1968.

R. Jeffrey Orr was named Power Financial Corporation CEO in 2005.

By 2007, IGM Financial was the holding company for Power Corporation's investment fund companies. Power Corporation also by 2009 had interests in the parent company of La Presse, Mackenzie Financial, London Life Insurance, Canada Life Assurance, Great-West Life, and Putnam Investments.

=== 2020 reorganization ===
On December 13, 2019, Power Corporation announced a reorganization transaction through which each common share of Power Financial would be exchanged for 1.05 subordinate voting shares of Power Corporation and $0.01 in cash. Upon the completion of the reorganization transaction, on February 13, 2020, Power Corporation holds all of the common shares of Power Financial, which were delisted from the Toronto Stock Exchange effective as of the close of business on February 18, 2020. Power Financial remains a reporting issuer in all of the provinces and territories of Canada.

The share price for Power Corporation increased by 7.9% following the initial announcement of the transaction as the reorganization is expected to benefit shareholders by creating long-term value through:

- Simplified and less costly structure with a reduction in operating expenses of $50M per year and a reduction in financial charges of $15M per year.
- A more focused strategy emphasizing financial services.
- Increased quarterly dividend by 10%

== Corporate governance ==
R. Jeffrey Orr was appointed as President and chief executive officer of Power Financial in 2005. Paul Desmarais Jr. and André Desmarais are respectively chairman and Deputy Chairman of the board.

The other members of the board of directors of Power Financial are Gary Doer, R. Jeffrey Orr, T. Timothy Ryan, Jr. and Siim A. Vanaselja. Directors emeritus of the company have included former chief executive officer James W. Burns and Michael Pitfield.

=== President ===
1. James William Burns, 1984–1986
2. Paul Desmarais Jr., 1986–1989
3. Robert Gratton, 1989–2005
4. R. Jeffery Orr, 2005–present

=== Chairman of the Board ===
1. Paul Desmarais, 1984–1986
2. James William Burns, 1986–1990
3. Paul Desmarais Jr., 1990–2005
4. Robert Gratton, 2005–2008
5. Paul Desmarais Jr., 2008–2020
  André Desmarais, 2008–2020
