= Robert Gratton =

Canadian financier (born 1943)

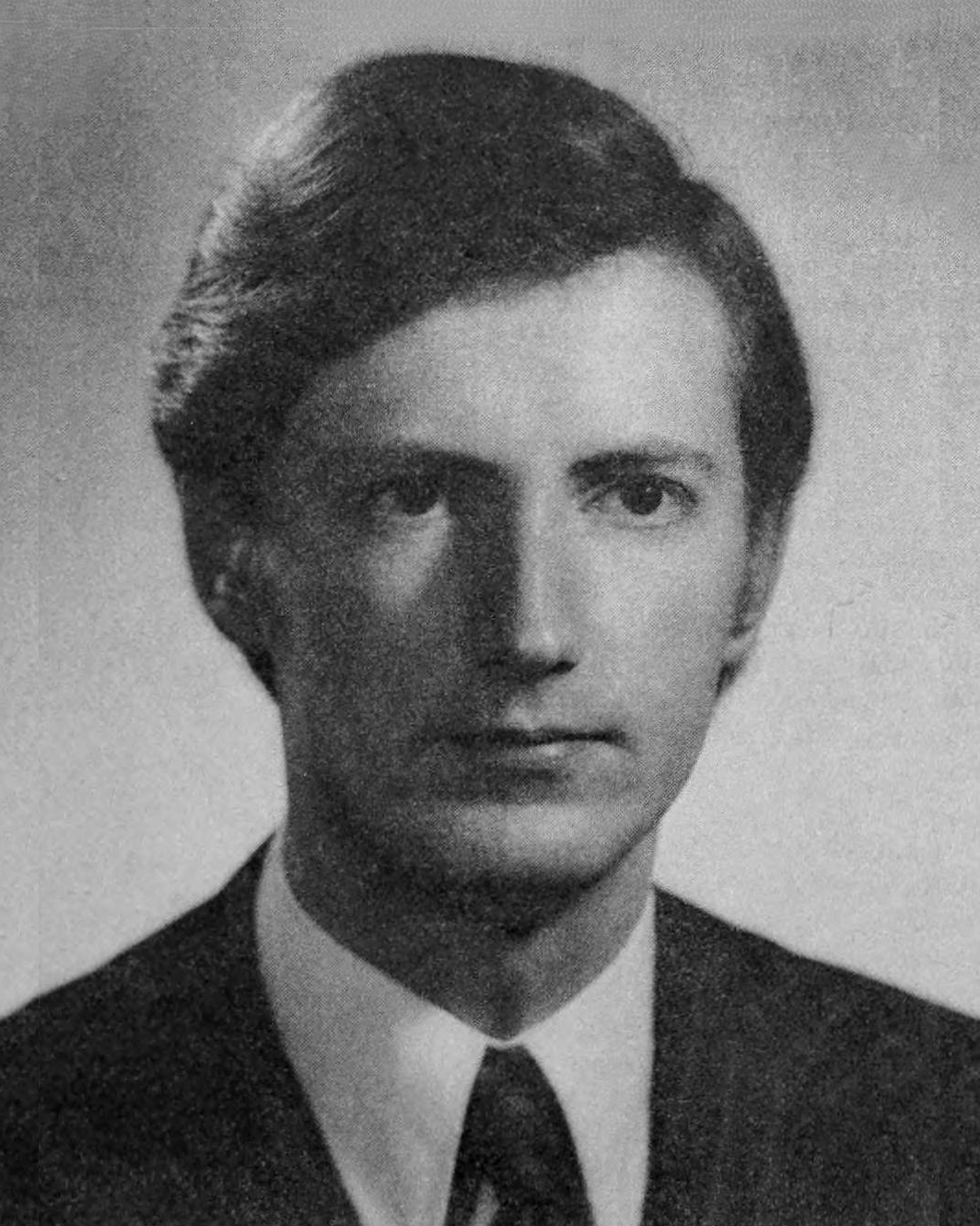
- Born: 23 October 1943 (age 82); Montreal, Quebec
- Education: Université de Montréal (LL.L '66); London School of Economics (LL.M '69); Harvard University (MBA '71)
- Spouse: Nicole Marcil (m. 1966; died 2018)

Robert Gratton (born 23 October 1943) is a Canadian retired lawyer and financier known best for his long tenure as an executive of companies affiliated with the Power Corporation of Canada.

Gratton graduated from the Université de Montreal with a law degree in 1966 and for the next two years worked as an assistant to Paul Gérin-Lajoie; he was called to the Bar of Quebec in 1967. He returned to university in 1968 and received degrees from the London School of Economics in 1969 and Harvard University in 1971. That year, Gratton joined the Crédit foncier franco-canadien, where he became general manager in 1975 and president in 1979.

In 1982 Gratton left Crédit foncier to become president and chairman of the Montreal Trust Company, which was controlled by Power Corporation. During his tenure, Gratton oversaw the massive growth and expansion of the company. Following the sale of Montreal Trust to BCE in 1989, Gratton was appointed president of Power Financial. Gratton served as president until 2005, when he was elected chairman of the board. From 2003 to 2008, he served additionally as chairman of Power subsidiaries Canada Life, London Life, and Great-West Life. Gratton held the chairmanship of Power Financial until 2008, and retired from the board of directors in May 2014.

== Early life ==
Robert Gratton was born in Montreal on 23 October 1943 to Dr Bernard Gratton (1917–1961) and Judith Dufour (1921–1996), who had married in July 1942. Bernard and Judith had five children: Robert, Paul, Michel, André, and Andrée-Anne. André Gratton died of leukemia in 1954 at age three. In 2007, the Gratton family founded the Maison André-Gratton, the first palliative care home in Montreal for children, in his honour. The Gratton family was descended from Claude Gratton (ca. 1630–1693) of Aubigny, Poitou. Claude arrived in New France in 1670 with his wife Marguerite Mossion.

Gratton attended the Université de Montreal, where he earned a licentiate in laws in 1966. Upon graduation he worked as an assistant to Paul Gérin-Lajoie, and in 1967 was called to the Bar of Quebec. In the fall of 1968, Gratton entered the London School of Economics, where he received a master of laws degree in 1969. Prior to his move to London, a friend had suggested he study business at Harvard University. Gratton related,

... after that conversation I started to read about Harvard and a little about business, and what I read was that the Harvard Business School has a world reputation. So I decided to go to the London School of Economics for only a year and to apply to the Harvard Business School. Nothing could have been more foreign to me because I was anti-business during my years at university. I spent a year in London, got a master's degree in law, then I went to Harvard. That changed my life.

Gratton graduated with a master of business administration from Harvard in 1971.

== Career ==
In 1971, he joined Crédit foncier franco-canadien in Montreal. In 1975, Gratton was appointed co-general manager, then executive vice-president in 1976, and was elected to the board of directors in 1977. In early 1979, Credit foncier was taken over by the Banque d'épargne, whose president was Gratton's father-in-law, André Marcil. That April, Marcil joined the Credit foncier board. The following month, aged 35, Gratton was appointed president of the company.

In December 1981, it was announced that Gratton would become president and chairman of the Montreal Trust Company. Gratton succeeded Paul Britton Paine in the roles at Montreal Trust, while he was succeeded at Crédit foncier by Raymond Garneau. Gratton had been recruited to Montreal Trust by Paul Desmarais of Power Corporation, the trust company's controlling shareholder, to improve its mediocre earnings. Gratton arranged a series of board meetings where he presented his business plan. The plan sought to grow the company's retail deposit business, which in effect brought the company into banking. Gratton initiated a complete restructuring of the company that divided its operations into two companies: one dealing with consumers and one with corporate clients. He also replaced most senior executives with new people brought in from banks. After a year and a half, Gratton's plan was mostly executed.

In the spring of 1989, Power Financial sold its 63.8 stake in Montreal Trust to BCE for $875 million. Gratton left Montreal Trust on 31 July 1989, and that fall became president of Power Financial. In May 2005, Gratton was elected chairman of Power Financial and was replaced as president by R. Jeffery Orr. Gratton remained chairman until the company's annual meeting in May 2008, when he stepped down and was appointed deputy chairman. During Gratton's tenure with Power, the company's value increased from $1.8 billion in 1992 to $28.7 billion in 2007, and its earnings grew 15 fold. Accordingly, Gratton had become one of the wealthiest men in Canada, with an estimated net value in November 2007 of $662 million. At Power Financial's annual meeting on 14 May 2014, the first to be held since Paul Desmarais's death, Gratton retired from the board of directors.

Gratton was for many years one of the highest-paid executives in the country. In 1997, he was the highest compensated, earning $27,395,123. In early 2004, Gratton made $170 million from stock options, which was one of the largest personal gains in Canadian history. On 14 January he exercised 439,000 options worth $18 million, and on 11 February he exercised 3.44 million options worth $152 million.

== Personal life ==
On 27 August 1966 at Saint-Viateur d'Outremont, Gratton married Nicole Marcil (1943–2018). The wedding was officiated by Jacques Laramée, who was Nicole's cousin. Nicole was the daughter of André Marcil (1910–1983) and Thérèse Beauchamp (1911–2016). André Marcil was a prominent Montreal financier who had served as chairman of the Banque d'épargne and as vice-chairman of Crédit foncier franco-canadien. During the war, André served as a naval officer and had been a liaison officer with Charles de Gaulle in the Battle of Dakar. André's father was Georges Marcil (1868–1926) who had founded the Marcil Trust Company, which was acquired by RBC Dominion Securities in 1990. Georges had been the last mayor of Notre-Dame-de-Grâce before it was annexed into Montreal.

Robert and Nicole had three children: Sophie, François, and Élisabeth. François is an executive vice-president of Telus. In 2003, Gratton purchased "Belmere," the former country estate of Sir Hugh Allan on Lake Memphremagog, from the Allan family. After he acquired the estate, he built a new house and gardens.
