= R. Jeffrey Orr =

Canadian financier

- Born: 12 November 1958 (age 67); Montreal, Quebec
- Education: University of Western Ontario (BA 1981)
- Spouse: Suzanne Legge (m. 1985)

Robert Jeffrey Orr (born 12 November 1958) is a Canadian financier who since 2020 has been president of the Power Corporation of Canada. Orr began his career in 1981 with the investment brokerage Nesbitt, Thomson & Co. in Montreal. In 1989 he relocated to Toronto where he became head of mergers and acquisitions, then in 1992 became head of government and corporate finance. In 1997, Orr was appointed vice-chairman of the company (which in 1994 had become Nesbitt Burns Inc.) and in 1999 was appointed chairman of the board.

In early 2001, the Desmarais family, who were longstanding clients of Nesbitt Burns and with whom Orr was close personally, recruited him from the brokerage. Effective 1 May 2001, Orr was appointed president of Investors Group, one of the companies in the Power Corporation group. Subsequently, in 2005 he was elected a director of Power Corporation and Power Financial, and was appointed president of Power Financial. In 2008 he was elected chairman of IGM Financial, and in 2013 he was elected chairman of Great-West Lifeco and its subsidiaries Canada Life, Great-West Life, and London Life. Upon the retirement of Paul Desmarais Jr. and André Desmarais as co-chief executive officers of Power Corporation, on 13 February 2020 Orr was appointed president and chief executive officer of the company.

== Biography ==
Robert Jeffrey Orr was born on 12 November 1958 to John Cecil Orr Jr. (1923–1995) and Sheila Mary Power (1922–2015). John and Sheila both came from prominent Westmount families. John Jr. was the son of John Cecil Orr Sr. (1897–1979), an executive with the Canadian International Paper Company. John Sr. was born to a Scots-Quebecer father and French Canadian mother, and inherited his mother's Catholic religion. Sheila was the daughter of Edmund de Gaspé Power (1888–1950), a vice-president of Marine Industries Limited. Edmund descended from William Power, an Irish Catholic judge who had married Suzanne Aubert de Gaspé, a member of the Aubert de Gaspé family.

John and Sheila married on 17 July 1943 at the chapel of Loyola College. John served for three years as an officer in the Royal Canadian Naval Volunteer Reserve during World War II and fought in the North Atlantic. Following the war, he attended McGill University and graduated in 1948. He spent his career with Simonds Saw, becoming a vice-president of the Canadian division, and a vice-president of the parent company, Wallace-Murray Corporation. The Orrs had eight children.

Jeffrey Orr entered the University of Western Ontario in 1976, where he graduated Bachelor of Arts in 1981 with an honours degree in business administration. Additionally, Orr earned a designation as a Chartered Business Valuator.

Upon graduation in 1981, Orr returned to Montreal where he began working for the investment brokerage Nesbitt, Thomson & Co. From 1981 to 1988, he held various positions in their government and corporate finance department. In 1989, Orr moved to the company's Toronto office where he became head of mergers and acquisitions. He held this post until October 1992, when he was appointed vice-president for corporate and government finance. On 1 September 1994, Nesbitt, Thomson & Co. merged with Burns Fry Limited of Toronto to form Nesbitt Burns. Upon the merger, Orr became executive vice-president for investment banking. Orr played a major role in the integration of Nesbitt Burns operations into the Bank of Montreal. Following the completion of the integration, in April 1999 Orr was appointed chairman and chief executive officer of Nesbitt Burns, succeeding Brian Steck.

On 24 April 2001, then aged 42, Orr announced his resignation from Nesbitt Burns, effective 1 May. Two months earlier, Orr had worked with the Desmarais family of Montreal to arrange the acquisition of Mackenzie Investments by Investors Group. Upon his resignation, rumours circulated that Orr had been lured from the brokerage by the Desmarais family to take a post within its Power Corporation empire. Effective 1 May 2001, Orr was appointed president of Investors Group.

After four years as head of Investors Group, on 9 May 2005 Orr was appointed president and chief executive officer of Power Financial, the main subsidiary of Power Corporation, succeeding Robert Gratton, who became chairman of the board. Additionally, Orr was elected a director of Power Financial and Power Corporation.

In May 2013, Orr was elected chairman of Great-West Lifeco, the insurance holding company controlled by Power Financial, succeeding. Raymond Lindsay McFeetors. The appointment made him additionally the chairman of Lifeco's subsidiaries Canada Life, Great-West Life, and London Life. In 2019, Orr oversaw the merger of the three subsidiaries into a single company using the Canada Life name, which became effective 1 January 2020.

At the Power Corporation annual meeting in February 2020, Paul Desmarais Jr. and André Desmarais stepped down as co-chief executive officers of the corporation. Effective 13 February 2020, Orr was appointed president and chief executive officer. The appointment placed Orr atop one of the largest corporate concerns in Canada. Orr remains president of Power Corporation and Power Financial, and chairman of Great-West Lifeco and IGM Financial.

On 14 June 1985, Orr married Suzanne Legge. The couple met while attending the University of Western Ontario and have three children. The Orrs contribute to numerous philanthropic causes. In 2021, they donated $1 million to the McGill University Health Centre Foundation.
