= St. Charles Country Club =

Private club in Winnipeg, Manitoba

- Interactive map of St. Charles Country Club
- 49.867°N 97.285°W

Club information
- Location: Winnipeg, Manitoba, Canada
- Established: 1905
- Type: Private
- Total holes: 27
- Tournaments: Canadian Open (1952) du Maurier Classic (1992); Canadian Women's Open (2010)
- Website: stcharlescountryclub.ca

Ross/MacKenzie
- Designed by: Donald Ross and Alister MacKenzie
- Par: 72
- Length: 6749 yd
- Course record: 63 (Dennis Batacan)

MacKenzie/Thompson
- Designed by: Alister MacKenzie, Riley Johns and Keith Rhebb
- Par: 71
- Length: 6450 yd
- Course record: 63 (Matt Downing)

Thompson/Ross
- Designed by: Riley Johns, Keith Rhebb and Donald Ross
- Par: 71
- Length: 6589 yd
- Course record: 64 (Braxton Kuntz)

St. Charles Country Club is a private country club in Winnipeg, Manitoba. It features three 9-hole golf courses, each with a distinct style that reflects the golf course designer responsible for it.

== History ==
The original 18-hole course was opened in 1904, but three legendary golf course designers are responsible for the current 27 holes. In 1919, Donald Ross rebuilt the course and created the two nines that now comprise the South and West nines. Alister MacKenzie was then hired to create an additional nine holes and designed the North nine, which opened in 1931. In 1954, Canada's Norman Woods was responsible for the renovation and redesign of the West nine. The North, West and South Nines were renamed the MacKenzie, Woods, and Ross nines, respectively, in honour of the designer responsible for each nine following the club's centennial celebrations in 2004.

The course has played host to LPGA, Senior PGA and Shell's Wonderful World of Golf events. The club hosted the 1952 Canadian Open, a PGA Tour tournament, which was won by Johnny Palmer, and the 1992 du Maurier Classic, an LPGA major, which was won by Sherri Steinhauer.

In August 2010, the club hosted the LPGA's Canadian Women's Open, won by Michelle Wie; the MacKenzie (North) nine was used as the front nine, and the Ross (South) nine was used as the back nine.

== Status ==
Jeffry Hall Brock, the founder of the largest publicly traded company based in Winnipeg Great-West Lifeco, was one of the club's founding members. Since then, St. Charles has enjoyed a reputation of being the elite private club in the city of Winnipeg.

Longtime Head Chef Takashi "Tony" Murakami is widely known as one of the top chefs in the country and was captain and a member of the Canadian national culinary team for ten years, including Canada's world championship team in 1984, later serving as team coach. He has been named a member of the Order of Canada.

== Golf Courses ==
Thompson/Ross
Tee	Rating/Slope	1	2	3	4	5	6	7	8	9	Out	10	11	12	13	14	15	16	17	18	In	Total
Par		5	4	4	4	3	4	3	4	4	35	4	3	4	5	4	3	5	4	4	36	71
Championship		560	367	385	310	163	465	103	364	428	3145	343	180	441	552	445	141	520	365	457	3444	6589

Ross/MacKenzie
Tee	Rating/Slope	1	2	3	4	5	6	7	8	9	Out	10	11	12	13	14	15	16	17	18	In	Total
Par		4	3	4	5	4	3	5	4	4	36	4	4	4	5	3	4	3	5	4	36	72
Championship		343	180	441	552	445	141	520	365	457	3444	414	447	259	398	503	130	376	195	583	3305	6749

MacKenzie/Thompson
Tee	Rating/Slope	1	2	3	4	5	6	7	8	9	Out	10	11	12	13	14	15	16	17	18	In	Total
Par		4	4	4	4	5	3	4	3	5	36	5	4	4	4	3	4	3	4	4	35	71
Championship		414	447	259	398	503	130	376	195	583	3305	560	367	385	310	163	465	103	364	428	3145	6450

== See also ==
- List of golf courses in Manitoba
