= Great-West Lifeco =

Canadian insurance company

Great-West Lifeco Inc.
- Type: Public
- Traded as: TSX: GWO
- ISIN: CA39138C1068
- Industry: Financial services and insurance
- Founded: 15 May 1986
- Founder: Jeffry Hall Brock
- Headquarters: Winnipeg, Manitoba, Canada
- Key people: David Harney (President & CEO); R. Jeffrey Orr (Chairman)
- Revenue: ▲CA$43.98 billion (2025)
- Net income: ▲CA$3.96 billion (2025)
- AUM: ▲CA$1.14 trillion (2025)
- Total assets: ▲CA$862.83 billion (2025)
- Total equity: ▲CA$33.00 billion (2025)
- Owner: Power Financial (66.9%)
- Number of employees: 33,430 (2025)
- Subsidiaries: Canada Life; Great-West Lifeco U.S. LLC; Empower Retirement
- Website: www.greatwestlifeco.com

Great-West Lifeco Inc. is a Canadian insurance-centered financial holding company that operates in North America (Canada and United States), Europe and Asia through five wholly owned, regionally focused subsidiaries. Many of the companies it has indirect control over are part of its largest subsidiary, The Canada Life Assurance Company; the others (Great West Life & Annuities Financial Inc.) are managed by Great-West Lifeco U.S. LLC, a U.S. based subsidiary. Great-West Lifeco is indirectly controlled by Montreal billionaire Paul Desmarais Jr. through his stake in the Power Corporation of Canada (owned by the Desmarais family since 1968), which owns 72% (down slightly from 74.6% in 2005) of Great-West Lifeco. The hyphen in the company's name was originally a typesetter's error.

For the three months ending June 2013, 63% of revenue originated in Canada, 26% from the U.S., and 10% from Europe. Group retirement products (Canadian sales up 49%) and 401k markets (U.S. Great West Financial sales up 34%) remain key areas of growth for the company. Lower U.K. wealth management single premiums negatively affected growth. Approximately half of company profit comes from Canada, a third from Europe and the rest from the United States. In the first half of 2011, premium income made up 63.99% of total revenue, up from 56.07%. In the third quarter of 2010, British sales outpaced all other regions with 45% growth, followed by the U.S. financial services business (up 41%). In 2009, 100% owned subsidiary London Life ranked 14th among Canada's largest private companies.

== History ==
Great-West Life was founded in Winnipeg in 1891 by Jeffry Hall Brock, a local insurance agent. The company was incorporated on August 28, 1891, with locals such as James Ashdown on its board. It built its head office in the exchange District in Winnipeg on the corner of Rorie Street and Lombard Avenue. In 1912, two policyholders who died on the Titanic were covered by the company, after its first death payout in 1893.

The earliest roots of any of the companies under its management were set in 1847 Hamilton, Ontario by subsidiary Canada Life (then known as Canada Life Assurance Company); it was later acquired by The Great-West Life Assurance Company. The original name of Canada Life included the word Assurance in place of insurance, something that was more common among British companies. Its second oldest company London Life was founded in 1874 and taken over by Great-West in 1997, one year after it purchased the Canadian operations of the Prudential Insurance Company of America

When created in 1890–1891, 31 of the 40 insurance companies in Canada were foreign-owned and none of the Canadian-based ones were managed from Western Canada. Great-West's founder started the company as an attempt to raise capital needed locally to develop farm land and retail businesses. Great-West's first president was Winnipeg mayor Alexander Macdonald who took on that role in 1892; the founder Jeffry Hall Brock was managing director. Its first death claim was in 1893 for $1,000, and in 1912 two Titanic policyholders were covered. In 1906, Great-West entered the American market starting in Fargo, North Dakota, followed by Michigan and Minnesota in 1920 and later Indiana, Missouri, Ohio, Kansas, California, and Pennsylvania in the early 1940s. Within its first decade, it successfully entered Eastern Canada, had market exposure in every Canadian province and became one the industry's leading companies in terms of growth and size; by 1896, it was present throughout Canada. Brock got sick and was forced to leave Great-West in 1912, three years before he died. He was succeeded as CEO by C.C. Ferguson in 1915. During the next twenty years the company's finances were negatively affected by World War I, the 1918 flu epidemic and the great depression but its market position remained strong; the stock market crash of 1929 and World War II had a positive impact on the company. The company was highly diversified, with investments spread amongst mortgages and government bonds. Great-West's early success in Western Canada was due in part to high insurance rates and a lack of financing available to farmers.

In 1942, it was the first Canadian company "to enter the accident and health insurance business." In 1960, the company moved to Osborne Street North, where it had constructed a new building on the site of the old Osborne Stadium. In 1969, Great-West was purchased by Power Corporation of Canada of Paul Desmarais, and was subsequently made into a wholly owned subsidiary. The takeover prompted the resignation of Great-West president David E. Kilgour, whose exit and severance settlement was negotiated by his son-in-law, John Turner, through Fraser Elliott. Kilgour was succeeded as president by James Burns. In 1983, the company expanded again into a building on Broadway and Osborne. In 1979, US and Canadian operations became separate due mostly to rapid US growth. In 1982, Great-West began offering a universal life policy which differed from those offered by competitors. Two years later, in 1984, the Power Financial Corporation was created to be a holding company for Great-West and its numerous businesses. In 1997, Great-West Lifeco took over London Life, acquiring Canada Life Financial in 2003.

Great-West Lifeco began an acquisitions spree on February 17, 2003, when it purchased Canada Life Financial for US$4.7 billion followed by Indiana Health Network incIHN three years later in 2006 and Putnam Investment Trust on August 3, 2007, for $3.9 billion (from Marsh & McLennan Companies). On April 1, 2008, subsidiary Great-West Life & Annuity Insurance Company sold Denver based Great-West Healthcare to CIGNA for about US$1.9 billion. With the transaction Great-West Lifeco lost about 1.9 million customers (about three quarters of their medical employers).

Other acquisitions include the 2006 takeover of US Bancorp's retirement plans business which added $104 billion in assets at the time, and more retirement plans the same year but from MetLife.

Irish Life, based in Dublin as a life assurance, pensions, and investments group, was acquired by Great West Lifeco in 2013 from the Irish government. On July 18, 2013, Canadian subsidiary Canada Life Limited completed the takeover of Irish Life Assurance.

Great-West Lifeco in 2018 acquired Invesco (Ireland), an Irish company. In October 2018, Stefan Kristjanson retired and was replaced by Jeff Macoun as COO of Great-West Lifeco Inc. In January 2019, Protective Life Insurance Co. bought part of Great-West Life & Annuity Insurance Co. for $1.2 billion. A merger of several divisions and subsidiaries to be renamed, the Canada Life amalgamation received approval from the Canadian government in November 2019. They officially begin operating as The Canada Life Assurance Company on January 1, 2020. After the merger into Canada Life, employees of the merged companies will work from company's five main offices in Winnipeg, London, Toronto, Montreal and Regina, with no cuts to employment.

In July 2021, Prudential Financial announced the sale of its retirement-related businesses to Great-West for 3.5 billion dollars.

On May 31, 2023, Great-West Lifeco announced that Franklin Templeton Investments would acquire Putnam Investments for $925 million. Putnam Investments subsidiary, PanAgora Asset Management would not be included in the acquisition. The deal was completed in January 2024.

== Companies ==
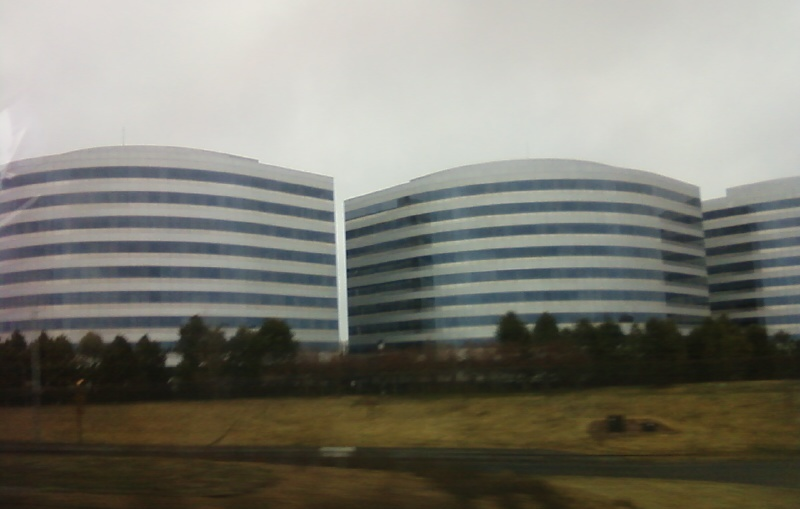
Headquarters of American division Great-West Life & Annuity Insurance Company, Greenwood Village, Colorado

- Great West Life & Annuity Insurance Company is a company that provides individuals and businesses in all of the USA's states with life insurance, retirement benefits (which are paid for by employers) and annuities distributed by its own brokers and institutions. This division began operations in the USA on May 28, 1997.
- Empower Retirement is a retirement plan recordkeeping company based in Greenwood Village, Colorado. It is the second-largest retirement plan provider in the US.
- The Great West Life Assurance Company is Canada's biggest insurance company. The subsidiary became Canada's leader in 2003 when it paid Cdn$7.3 billion (US$4.7 billion) for Canada Life Financial. Products include trust securities. Great-West Life, Canada Life, and London Life were rebranded as the new Canada Life on January 1, 2020
- Canada Life was founded in 1847 and operates in Ireland, Canada, the UK, Germany, and the Isle of Man. Business focusses on insurance (life, disability, creditor and critical illness) and wealth management. European business goes back to 1903 and provides different regions with different products (insurance and savings are offered in every region except the UK (where annuities and group insurance are provided) and Germany (where business comes from pensions and critical illness).
- London Life is a 140-year-old business currently serving 2 million Canadians. Operates under the banners Great-West, Freedom 55 (savings, investments, retirement, insurance and mortgages), Quadrus Investment Services Ltd. (mutual funds), London Reinsurance Group (international business).
- Irish Life, acquired in 2013 for €1.3 Billion
