= Irish Life =

Life assurance and pensions company

Irish Life Assurance plc
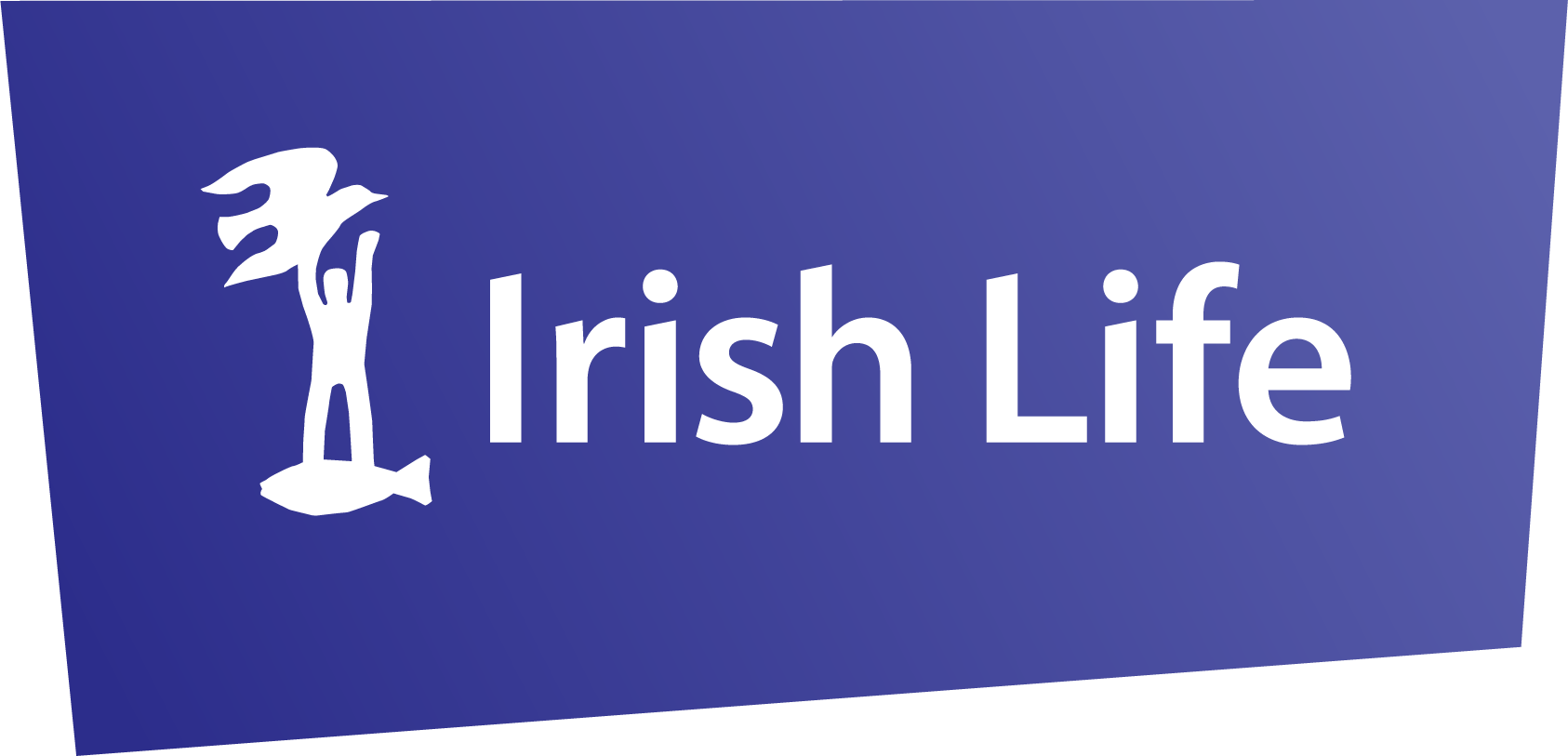
- Industry: Financial services
- Founded: 1939
- Headquarters: Dublin, Ireland
- Key people: Declan Bolger (CEO), (Chairman of the FSI Board)
- Products: Pensions, life assurance, health insurance, portfolio investments
- Parent: Great-West Lifeco
- Website: www.irishlife.ie

Irish Life Assurance plc, commonly known as Irish Life, is an Irish financial services group, providing private and workplace pensions, health insurance, protection, and investments to its customers. Irish Life has been part of the Great-West Lifeco group of companies since 2013, one of the world’s leading life assurance organisations. Irish Life is also a member of the Power Financial Corporation group of companies.

== Operations ==
Today Irish Life is one of Ireland’s leading financial services groups, taking care of over 1.6 million customers, more than 1 in 3 adults in Ireland.

Irish Life provides life and health insurance, pensions and investments to individuals as well as risk, defined contribution pension, health insurance and wellbeing solutions for employers and affinity groups.

Irish Life Investment Managers (ILIM), is the appointed asset manager for the Irish Life Group. It is one of the largest managers of life assurance and pension assets in Ireland, entrusted with assets exceeding €131 billion (as of 31.12.2024) across a broad range of asset classes and investment solutions.

The group is also a leading provider of financial advice in Ireland through its associate companies including Unio for wealth management advisory for personal and corporate clients and Cornmarket.

== Sponsorship ==
Irish Life is a leading sponsor of health and wellbeing initiatives in communities across Ireland, with the goal of helping people to live healthier lives and build better futures.

In 2015 Irish Life partnered with the GAA to develop the Irish Life GAA Healthy Clubs initiative. The programme helps GAA clubs support the holistic health of their members and the communities they serve.

In 2022, the Group became the title sponsor of the Irish Life Dublin Marathon, Ireland’s largest and best-known annual marathon event. The sponsorship also covers the Dublin Race Series which consists of three races during the summer months building up in distance from a 10 km to a half marathon to prepare runners for the marathon in late October.

== History ==
The Irish Life assurance company was created in 1939 and concentrated on life assurance and investment products.

In 1936, as a result of the Great Depression, many life assurance companies were technically insolvent. The four which merged to form Irish Life (and their years of incorporation) were the City of Dublin Assurance (1925); Irish Life and General Assurance (1923); Irish National Assurance (1919); and Munster and Leinster Assurance (1929). Later, some British companies shed their Irish operations and merged them into this new company. These were Prudential Assurance, Britannic Assurance, Liverpool Victoria, Pearl Assurance, and Refuge Assurance Company. The 1939 company followed the procedures of the Prudential, its largest component.

The Prudential re-entered the Irish market under its own name, then sold their second Irish operation to the Insurance Corporation of Ireland (ICI). Allied Irish Banks took over Insurance Corporation of Ireland. Shortly afterwards, the general insurance company became insolvent. The Insurance Corporation of Ireland Life (ICI Life) was the Life Assurance subsidiary of the Insurance Corporation of Ireland. The Government of Ireland wrote off the debts of Insurance Corporation of Ireland and sold the ICI Life arm as a profitable going concern to Prudential. Prudential Life operated in Ireland until its acquisition by Irish Permanent Building Society. The life office then traded as Progressive Life. In 1999, Irish Life Assurance plc and the Irish Permanent Building Society merged to form the Irish Life and Permanent Group, and the operations of Progressive Life and Irish Life Assurance were merged.

Irish Life Assurance was never a fully state owned company. In 1939, the minister owned 18% of the shares in the company. In 1947, restructuring and purchase by Minister of Finance of shares held by British life assurance companies resulting in a government holding of 90.25%. In July 1991, these shares were released on the market.

Irish Life Assurance was a founding member of Irish Life & Permanent plc. In March 2012, during the Irish financial crisis, the Irish Life Group was purchased from Permanent TSB by the Irish State for €1.2 billion as part of the recapitalisation of Permanent TSB bank. This ended the association between Irish Life Assurance and PTSB.

In July 2013, Great-West Lifeco of Canada completed its purchase of Irish Life from the Irish State.

In 2016, Irish Life Health was formed when Irish Life acquired Aviva Health and bought out the 51 per cent of GloHealth that it didn't already own.

2023 saw the formation of Unio Financial Services Limited following the coming together of three wealth management and employee benefit companies, Invesco Limited, Acumen and Trust and APT, with the backing of Great-West Lifeco.

== CEOs ==
2020–Present: Declan Bolger

2016 – 2020: David Harney

2013 – 2016: Bill Kyle

== Subsidiaries ==
Founded in 1998, 'Irish Progressive Services International Ltd' (IPSI), a solution provider working in the Life and Pensions industry was part of the Irish Life and Permanent Group until the group sold to Great-West Lifeco. In 2020 FNZ, the global platform-as-a-service provider, acquired IPSI from Irish Life.
