= Canada Life Building =

Historic office building in Toronto

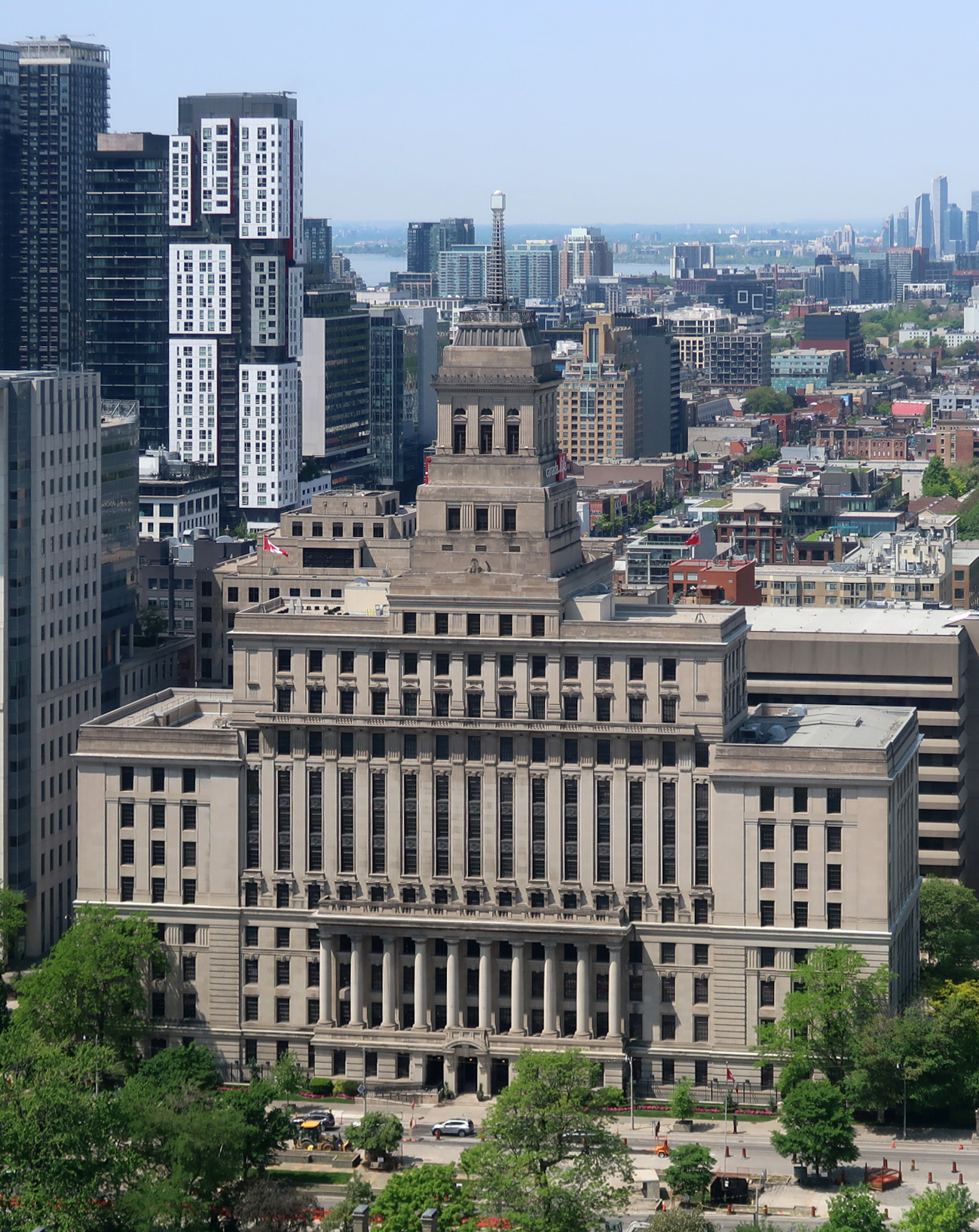
- Canada Life Building
- Interactive map of the Canada Life Building area

General information
- Type: Office building
- Location: 330 University Avenue; Toronto, Ontario, Canada
- Coordinates: 43.651704°N 79.387497°W
- Construction started: 1929
- Completed: 1931

Height
- Antenna spire: 321 feet (97.8 m)
- Roof: 285 feet (87 m)

Technical details
- Floor count: 17

Design and construction
- Architects: Sprott & Rolph; Kuwabara Payne McKenna

Ontario Heritage Act
- Type: Designated heritage property (Part IV)
- Designated: 1997-02-20

The Canada Life Building is a historic office building in Toronto, Ontario, Canada. The fifteen-floor Beaux Arts building was built by Sproatt & Rolph and stands at 285 feet (87 m), 321 feet (97.8 m) including its weather beacon.

It is located at University and Queen Street in the city's downtown core. Work on the new headquarters of the Canada Life Assurance Company began in 1929 and it opened in 1931. It was the fourth building to serve as the headquarters of Canada Life, Canada's oldest, and at the time largest insurance company. Previously it had been housed in offices at Bay and King Street. The Beaux Arts structure was the first of a series of planned structures along University Avenue, but the Great Depression halted these plans. When it was completed it was one of the tallest buildings in Toronto. It remains one of the largest office buildings in Toronto with windows that can be opened by its occupants. The facade is cladded with Indiana Limestone.

The building also houses the majority of the Civil operations of the Ontario Superior Court of Justice for the Toronto region.

== Weather beacon ==
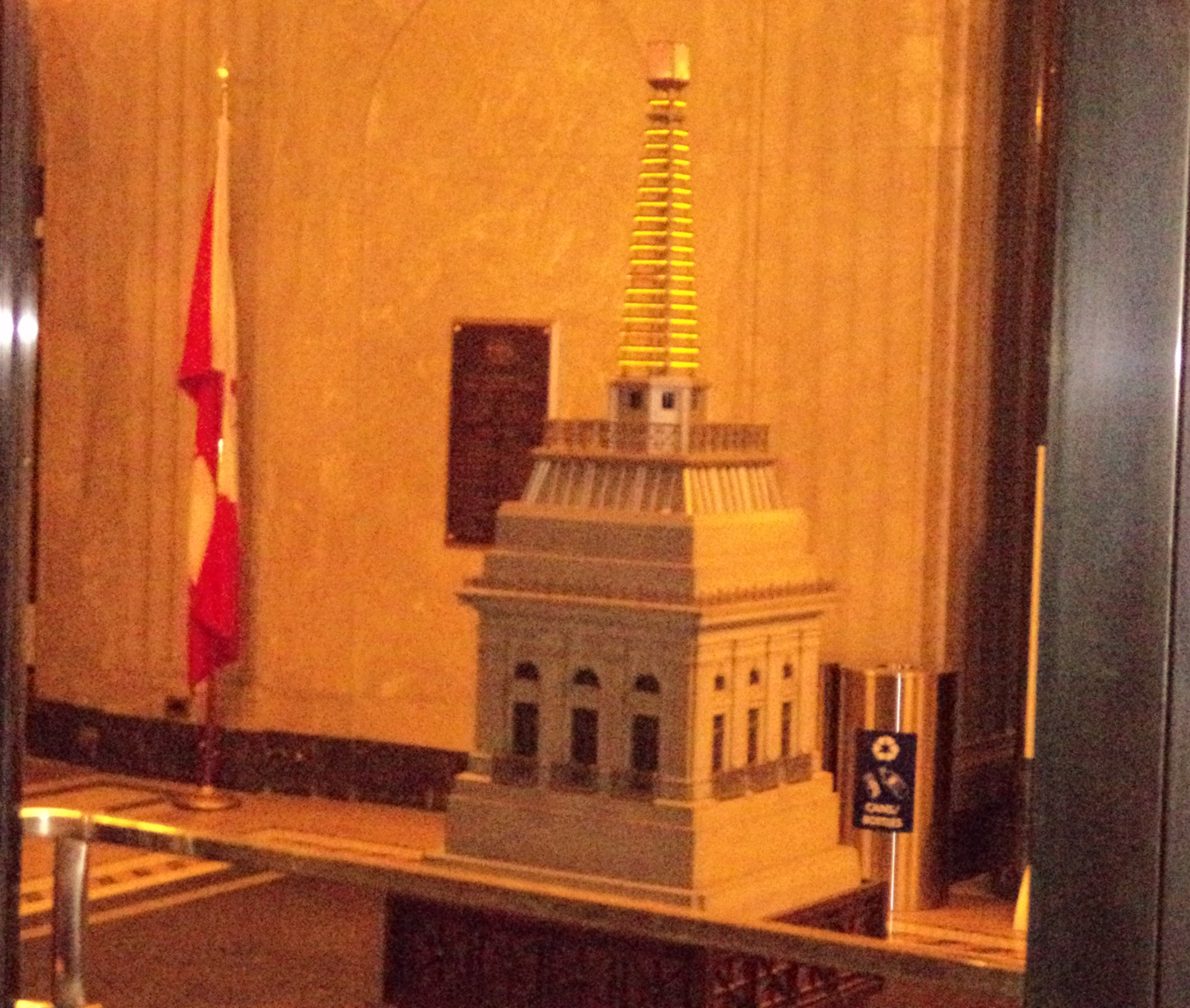
Model of the weather beacon in the lobby of the building

The building is perhaps best known for its weather beacon, whose colour codes provide summarized weather forecasts at a glance. The information is updated four times every day by Environment Canada's Weather Centre at Toronto Pearson International Airport. The forecast is for the next 4 hours. The top light shows:

- Steady green = clear
- Steady orange = cloudy
- Flashing orange = rain
- Flashing white = snow

The white lights along the support tower show:

- Lights running up = warmer
- Lights running down = cooler
- Steady = steady temperature / No change

Forecast Period:

- 7am beacon signals the conditions for the morning.
- 11am beacon signals the conditions for the afternoon.
- 3pm beacon signals the conditions for the evening.
- 7pm night beacon signals the conditions for the following day.

The beacon was the first of its kind to appear in Canada and was built at a cost of $25,000 (equivalent to $289,085 in 2025). The top of the beacon tower stands 321 feet (97.8 m) above University Avenue and, when completed on August 9, 1951, made the structure the third-highest in Toronto, after the Canadian Bank of Commerce Building and the Royal York Hotel.

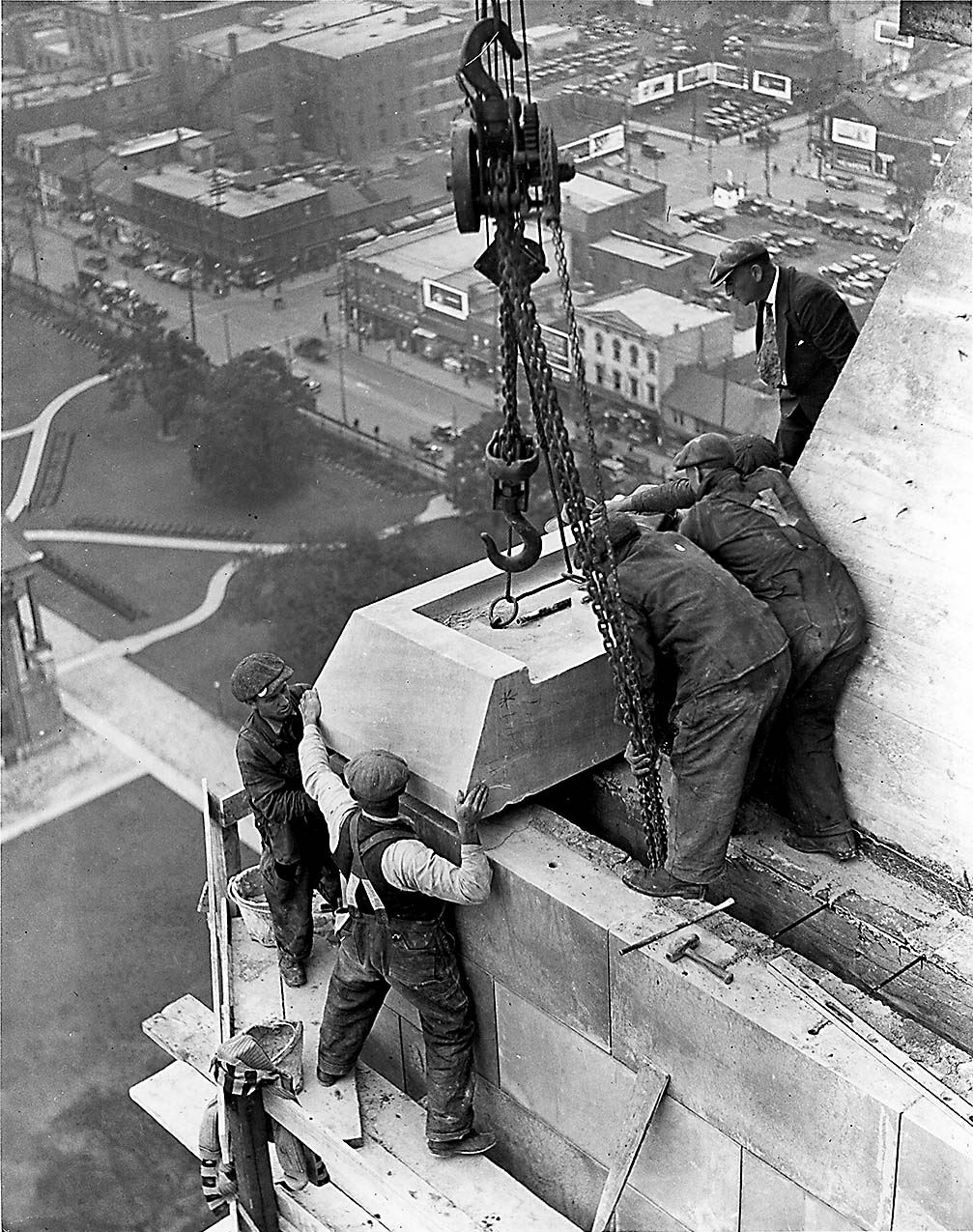
"Raising the last stone": The Canada Life building under construction in 1930. The bank vault was designed by Frederick S. Holmes.

== 190 Simcoe Street ==
190 Simcoe Street is a 9-floor addition to the campus, built directly west of the original. It connects to the original building through two enclosed, elevated walkways. Currently, only the 2nd floor walkway is used to move between the buildings. It was completed in 1970.

== 180 Simcoe Street ==
180 Simcoe Street is a 12-floor addition to the campus, built directly south of 190 Simcoe Street. It connects to 190 Simcoe Street through a short walkway. It was completed in 1994.

== Canada Life Tower – 180 Queen Street West ==
Canada Life Tower is a 16-floor addition to the campus, built south-west of the original. It connects to the rest of the campus through an underground loading dock area. It totals 16 floors and was designed by Kuwabara Payne McKenna. It was completed in 2005.

== See also ==
- Canada Life Building, Montreal
