= London Life Insurance =

Canadian insurance company (1874–2020)

- Industry: Life insurance
- Founded: 24 March 1874
- Defunct: 1 January 2020
- Fate: Merged into Canada Life
- Headquarters: 255 Dufferin Avenue, London, Ontario

The London Life Insurance Company was a Canadian life insurance company that existed from 1874 to 2020. In 1997, London Life was acquired outright by Great-West Lifeco, the holding company of the Great-West Life Assurance Company, headquartered in Winnipeg. Great-West Lifeco had since 1969 been controlled by the Power Corporation of Canada. In 2003, Lifeco acquired Canada Life, thus bringing three of the country's largest life insurers under its control. Through the 2000s and 2010s, Lifeco ran the three insurance companies effectively as one, though they retained separate corporate identities. On 1 January 2020, Lifeco merged the three companies under the Canada Life name.

== History ==
=== Formation of the company ===
On 24 March 1874, the Act to incorporate the London Life Assurance Company received Royal Assent in the Parliament of Ontario. The founding directors of the company were Edward Harris, Dr William Woodruff (1830–1908), John Walker, Joseph Jeffery (1829–1894), and James Magee (1846–1938). London Life was capitalised at $100,000 divided into 1,000 shares of $100 each. The company held its first shareholders meeting on 27 April, where Jeffery was appointed president, A. T. Chapman as vice-president, Dr Woodruff as consulting physician, and Macgee Campbell & McNab as solicitors. A board of 15 directors was elected.

=== The first century, 1874–1974 ===
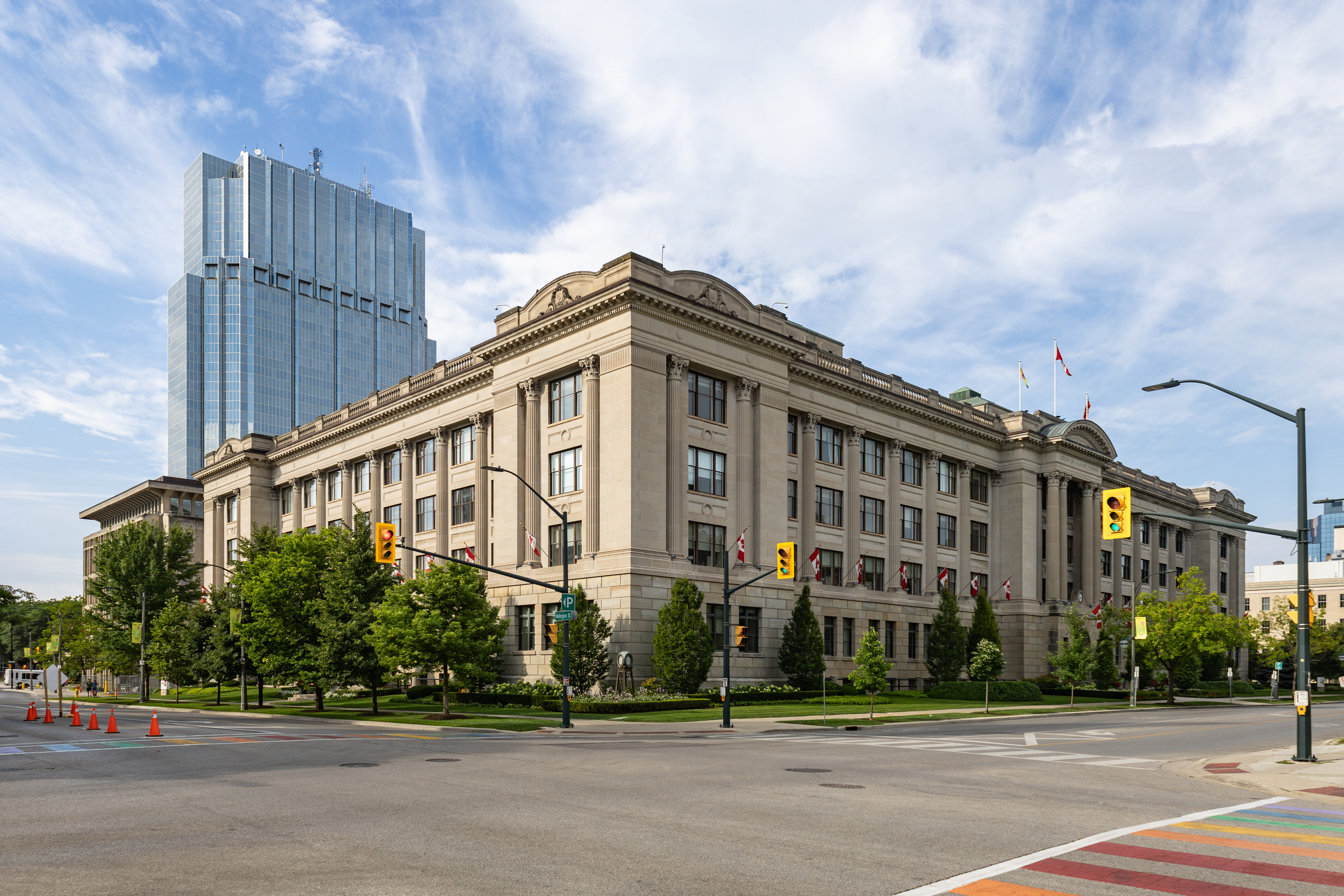
The head office on Dufferin Avenue was built in 1926 and was designed by John Mackenzie Moore.

The first general manager was George Case. In May 1875, Case left the company and was replaced by William Mardon. Elizur Wright of Boston was hired to perform year-end reserve calculations. London's first policy was purchased by W. F. Bullen, who later became a director of the company.

In 1883, Jeffery invited John George Richter (1854–1832) to London to discuss the company's affairs. Richter was a self-taught actuary and had been hired in 1882 as an agent. Following the meeting with Jeffery, Richter was hired as London's new general manager. In April 1883, Jeffery hired Richter as general manager to replace Mardon, who had left the company the following month. Richter's conditions for taking the job were that the company cease its accident insurance business, fix its capital impairment, and obtain a federal charter. In 1885 the company received its federal charter, and that same year, shareholders were asked to pay $9 per share to eliminate the capital impairment.

In 1886, a conflict within the company broke out that saw George B. Harris and Daniel Macfie, who together owned over half the company's shares, seek to remove Jeffery as president and replace him with Macfie. Richter, who was loyal to Jeffery, tendered his resignation in December of that year. At the annual meeting on 2 March 1887, a new board was elected, which appointed Macfie president. However, a group of shareholders representing one third ownership, and supporters of Jeffery, called a special meeting in April. Between the annual meeting and the special meeting, the group convinced Macfie to sell his shares, and thus the group gained control of the company. At the meeting on 12 April, Jeffery was reappointed president and Richter was reappointed manager. When Jeffery died in June 1884, his successor as president was John McClary.

=== Bronfmann ownership, 1974–1997 ===
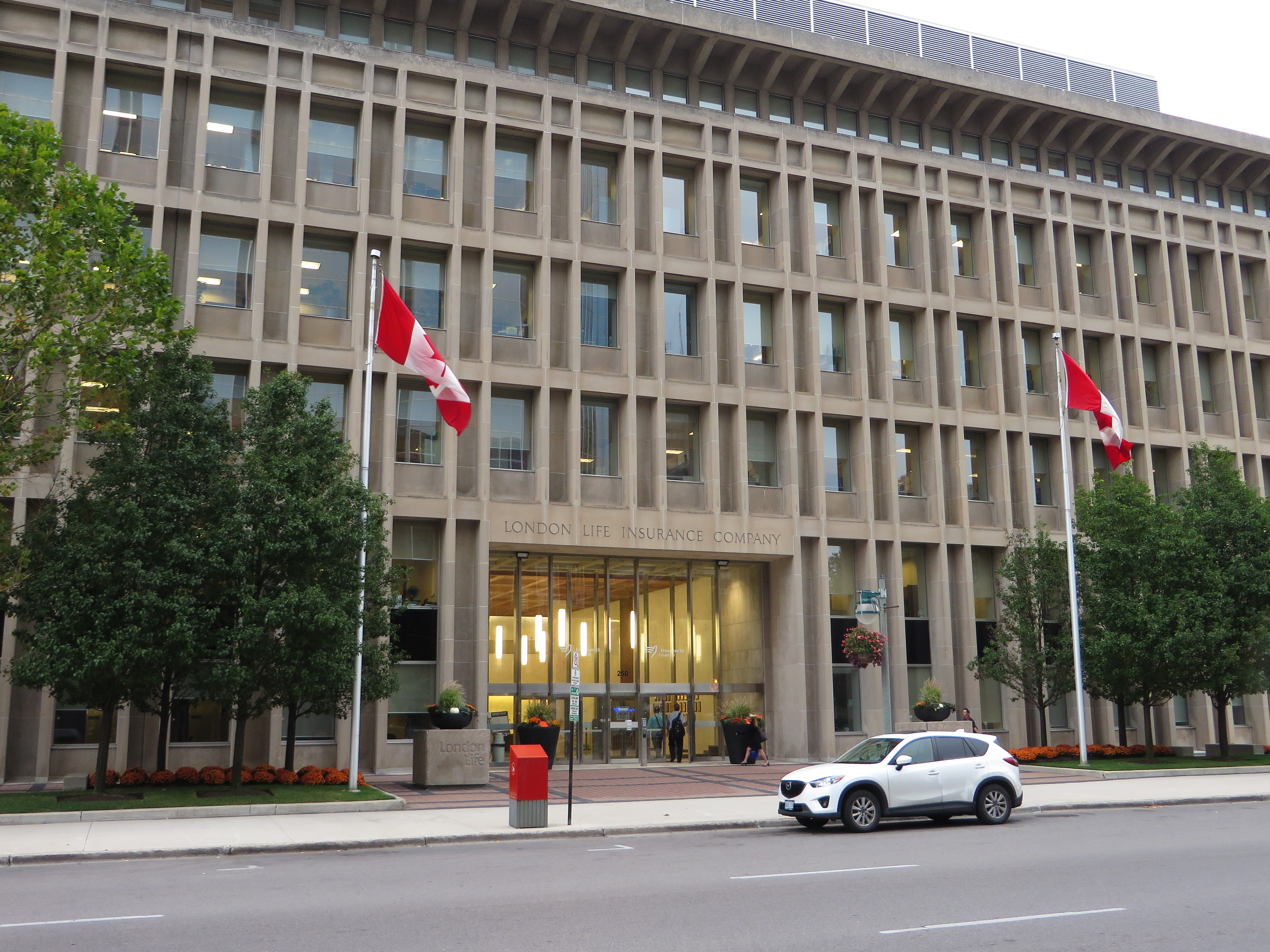
The 1963 addition along Queens Avenue was designed by Marani, Morris & Allan.

On 20 May 1977, Brascan, the Toronto-Dominion Bank, and the Jeffery family formed Lonvest Corp., which acquired 66 per cent of London Life shares.

In February 1990, Lonvest changed its name to the London Insurance Group Inc.

=== Great-West Lifeco ownership, 1997–2020 ===
In early June 1997, speculation began to circulate that suitors were meeting with Trilon Financial to discuss a possible sale of the London Insurance Group. On 25 June it was reported formally that Trilon was in talks with the Royal Bank of Canada, and on 27 June, the bank announced a $27.50 per share, or $2.4 billion, takeover bid for London Insurance.

On 19 August, Great-West Lifeco raised the bid for London Insurance Group to $33.50 per share for a total price of $2.9 billion. Great-West Lifeco, the parent company of the Great-West Life Assurance Company, had been founded in Winnipeg in May 1986. In 1997, G-W Lifeco was 86.5 per cent owned by the Power Corporation of Canada. On 21 August, the Royal Bank announced that it would exit the bidding war, allowing Great-West to complete the acquisition. On 4 November the takeover received approval from the federal Department of Finance. By 20 November, Great-West Lifeco had acquired 99 per cent of outstanding shares.

Following the takeover, the new owners relieved Tomczyk of the presidency and replaced him with Raymond McFeetors, the president of Great-West Life Assurance. Likewise, chairman Hawkrigg was replaced by James William Burns, the chairman of Great-West Lifeco and deputy-chairman of Power Corporation.

=== Merger with Canada Life, 2020 ===
In April 2019, Great-West Lifeco announced its intention to merge London Life, Great-West Life, and Canada Life into a single legal entity. By the time of the announcement, the companies had been operating effectively as a single company with three separate brands. Upon the merger, Lifeco stated that the continuing company would use the Canada Life name. By November, the merger received approval. Canada Life's president of Canadian operations, Jeff Macoun, stated that the merger was to streamline marketing, and that there would be no changes to policies of staffing. On 1 January 2020, London Life merged into Canada Life, bringing an end to the company just two months short of 146 years.

== Leadership ==
=== President ===
1. Joseph Jeffery, 1874–1887
2. Daniel Macfie, 1887
3. Joseph Jeffery, 1887–1893
4. John McClary, 1894–1918
5. Albert Oscar Jeffery, 1918–1927
6. John George Richter, 1928–1931
7. James Edgar Jeffery, 1932–1947
8. Archibald McPherson, 1948–1952
9. Joseph Jeffery, 1953–1957
10. Robert Haley Reid, 1957–1970
11. Alexander Haley Jeffery, 1971–1979
12. Earl Herbert Orser, 1980–1989
13. Gordon Ross Cunningham, 1989–1996
14. Fredric John Tomczyk, 1996–1997
15. Raymond Lindsay McFeetors, 1998–2008
16. David Allen Loney, 2008–2013
17. Paul Anthony Mahon, 2013–2020

=== Chairman of the Board ===
1. James Edgar Jeffery, 1948–1950
2. Archibald McPherson, 1953–1957
3. Joseph Jeffery, 1958–1981
4. Alexander Haley Jeffery, 1982
5. Allen Thomas Lambert, 1983–1986
6. Melvin Michael Hawkrigg, 1987–1989
7. Earl Herbert Orser, 1989–1994
8. Melvin Michael Hawkrigg, 1994–1997
9. James William Burns, 1997–2002
10. Robert Gratton, 2002–2008
11. Raymond Lindsay McFeetors, 2008–2013
12. Robert Jeffrey Orr, 2013–2020

== Company histories ==
- Allen, Robert Thomas. "What Do You Do Here?" "I'm Chairman of the Board." An Informal Look at London Life Entering Its Second Century. London Life Insurance Company, 1974.
- Campbell, James Alva. The Story of the London Life Insurance Company: Volume 1, 1874-1918. London Life Insurance Company, 1965.
- Campbell, James Alva. The Story of the London Life Insurance Company: Volume 2, 1919-1963. London Life Insurance Company, 1966.
- Fewster, L. Blake. London Life: A Look Back. London Life Insurance Company, 1998.
- The Golden Jubilee of the London Life Insurance Company, 1874–1924. London Life Insurance Company, 1924.
- Landon, Fred. John George Richter, 1854-1932: A Brief Record of His Life and Activities, with Particular Reference to His Connection with the London Life Insurance Company over a Period of Fifty Years.
