= Crédit foncier franco-canadien =

Canadian trust company (1880–1986)

- Industry: Financial services
- Founded: 24 July 1880
- Defunct: 31 December 1986
- Fate: Acquired by the Montreal Trust Company
- Headquarters: 612, rue Saint-Jacques, Montreal, Quebec

The Crédit foncier franco-canadien was a Canadian trust and loan company that existed from 1880 to 1986.

The company was incorporated in Quebec on 24 July 1880 by the Act to incorporate the Credit Foncier-Franco Canadien. The sponsors of the incorporation were Raphaël Maximillien Cahen d'Anvers of Paris, Edmond Jean Joubert of Paris, Charles Louis Sautter of Paris, Étienne Moranges of Versailles, Joseph-Adolphe Chapleau of Montreal, Étienne-Théodore Pâquet of Quebec City, Jonathan Saxton Campbell Würtele of Montreal, and Louis-Napoléan Carrier of Lévis. Joubert and Sautter both were officers of the Banque de Paris et des Pays-Bas.

In May 1986, Montreal Trust acquired Crédit foncier from the Montreal City and District Savings Bank for $130 million. The acquisition made Montreal Trust the country's fourth largest trust company after Canada Trust, Royal Trust, and National Trust. Effective 1 January 1987, Crédit foncier merged into Montreal Trust, bringing and end to the corporation after 106 years.

== Gallery of branches ==
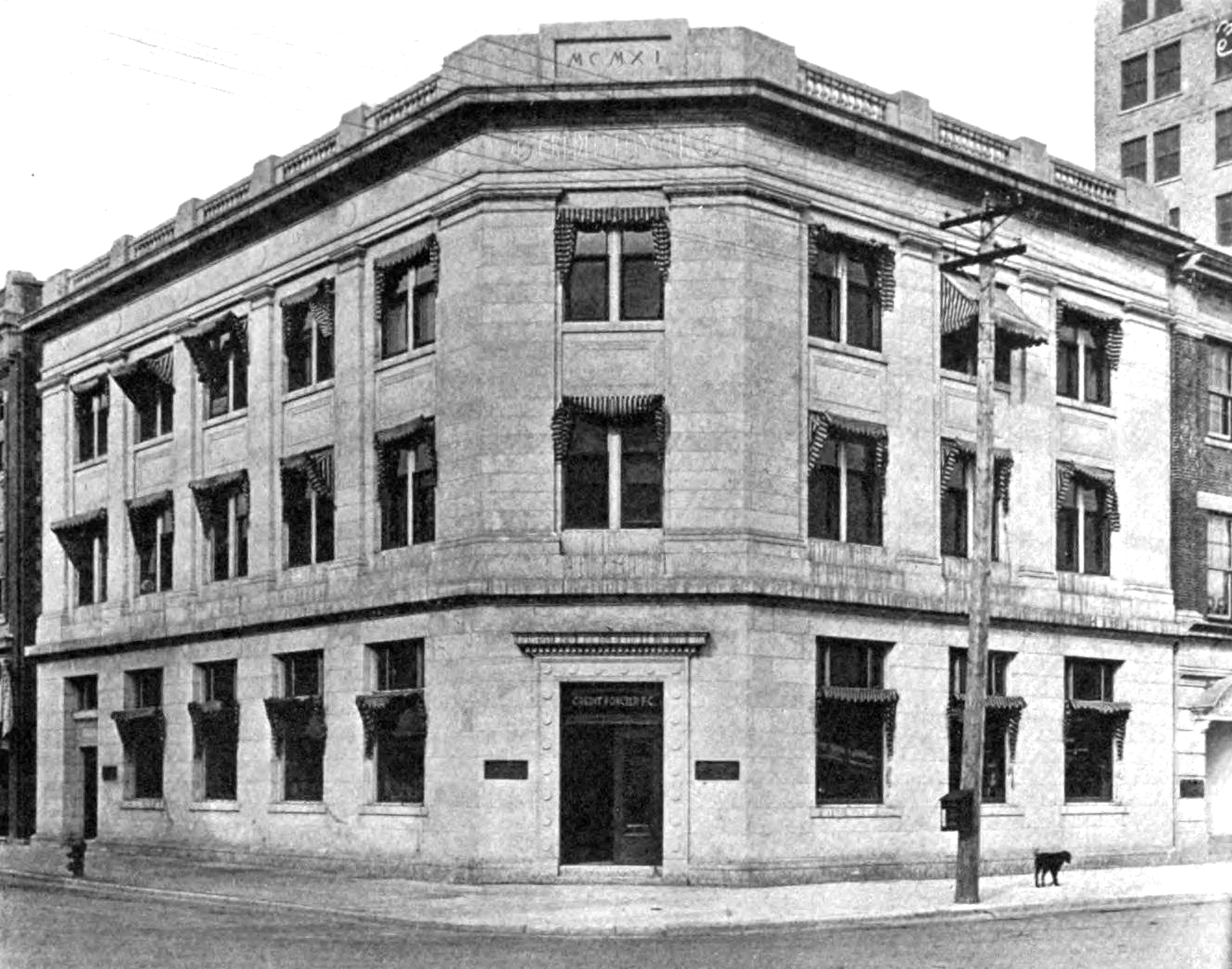
Regina

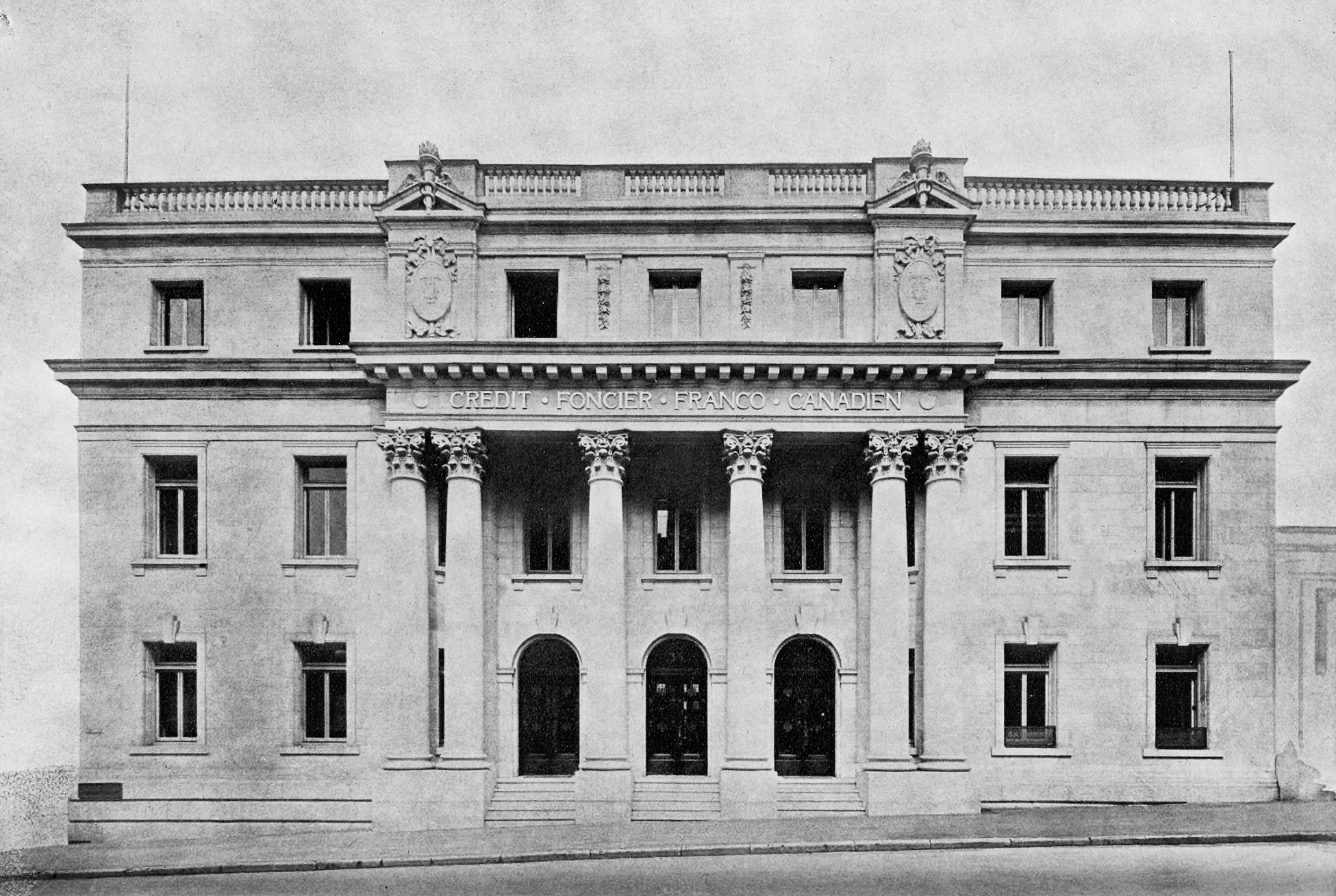
Montreal

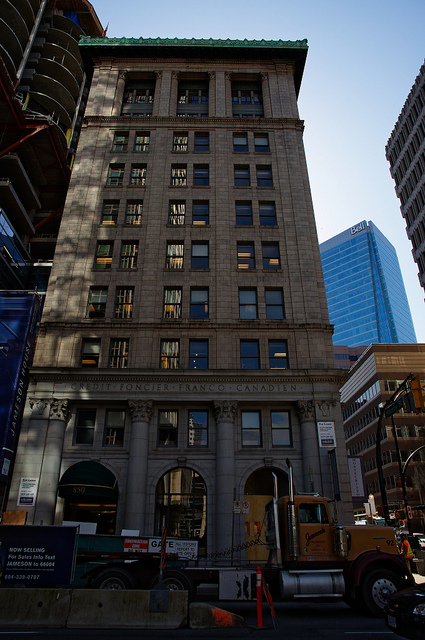
Vancouver
