= Montreal Trust Company =

Canadian trust company

- Formerly: Montreal Safe Deposit Company (1889–1885); Montreal Trust and Deposit Company (1895–1909)
- Industry: Trust company
- Founded: 21 March 1889
- Headquarters: Place Montreal Trust, Montreal, Quebec
- Parent: Bank of Nova Scotia (1994–present)

The Montreal Trust Company is a Canadian trust company that has existed since 1889. In 1967, Paul Desmarais acquired minority control of the company. The following year, he transferred his shares in the company to the Power Corporation of Canada, which in 1972 increased its share to a majority. In 1982, Montreal Trust formed a sister company called the Montreal Trust Company of Canada, and both companies were placed under a parent called Montreal Trustco Inc. In 1989, BCE acquired Montreal Trustco for $875 million. BCE ran the company at substantial loss for the next five years and sought a buyer in the summer of 1993. In the spring of 1994, the Bank of Nova Scotia acquired the company, and since that time it has operated as a subsidiary.

== History ==
Montreal Trust was founded by the Bank of Montreal. Donald Smith and Edward Clouston were amongst its charter board of directors.

=== Desmarais and Power Corporation control, 1967–1989 ===
In the 1960s, a chain of stock purchases saw Montreal Trust come under the control of financier Paul Desmarais. In 1961, the Gatineau Electric Company, a subsidiary of the Gatineau Power Company, was renamed Gelco Entreprises Limited and converted into an investment company. The following year, Desmarais purchased 50 per cent of Gelco. In 1963, Gelco acquired half the shares on the Imperial Life Assurance Company for $10 million, and shortly thereafter, increased its stake to 52 percent. Then, in October 1965, Imperial Life acquired around 30 per cent of the shares of Investors Group of Winnipeg. In April 1967, Investors Group acquired around 15 per cent of the shares of Montreal Trust. The shares were acquired from Canadian Pacific Investments in exchange for 483,615 common shares of Investors Group, worth around $5.6 million. By March 1968, the exchange had increased to 24 per cent of Montreal Trust shares. After the share exchange, Montreal Trust absorbed the Investors Trust Company, a wholly owned subsidiary of Investors Group.

The shares of Investors, Imperial, and Montreal Trust later were placed under the ownership of the Trans-Canada Corporation Fund, which Desmarais had acquired in 1965. Trans-Canada, in turn, was held by Gelco. In 1968, Desmarais arranged a share exchange with the Power Corporation of Canada, where the PCC would acquire Trans-Canada in exchange for 31.4 per cent control of the PCC to be held by Desmarais through Gelco.

In 1972, Investors Group increased its share in Montreal Trust to 50.5 per cent.

In 1982, Power formed second arm of Montreal Trust, the Montreal Trust Company of Canada, which had a federal incorporation. Both the Montreal Trust Company and the Montreal Trust Company of Canada were placed under a new parent company with a federal incorporation, called the Montreal Trustco Inc.

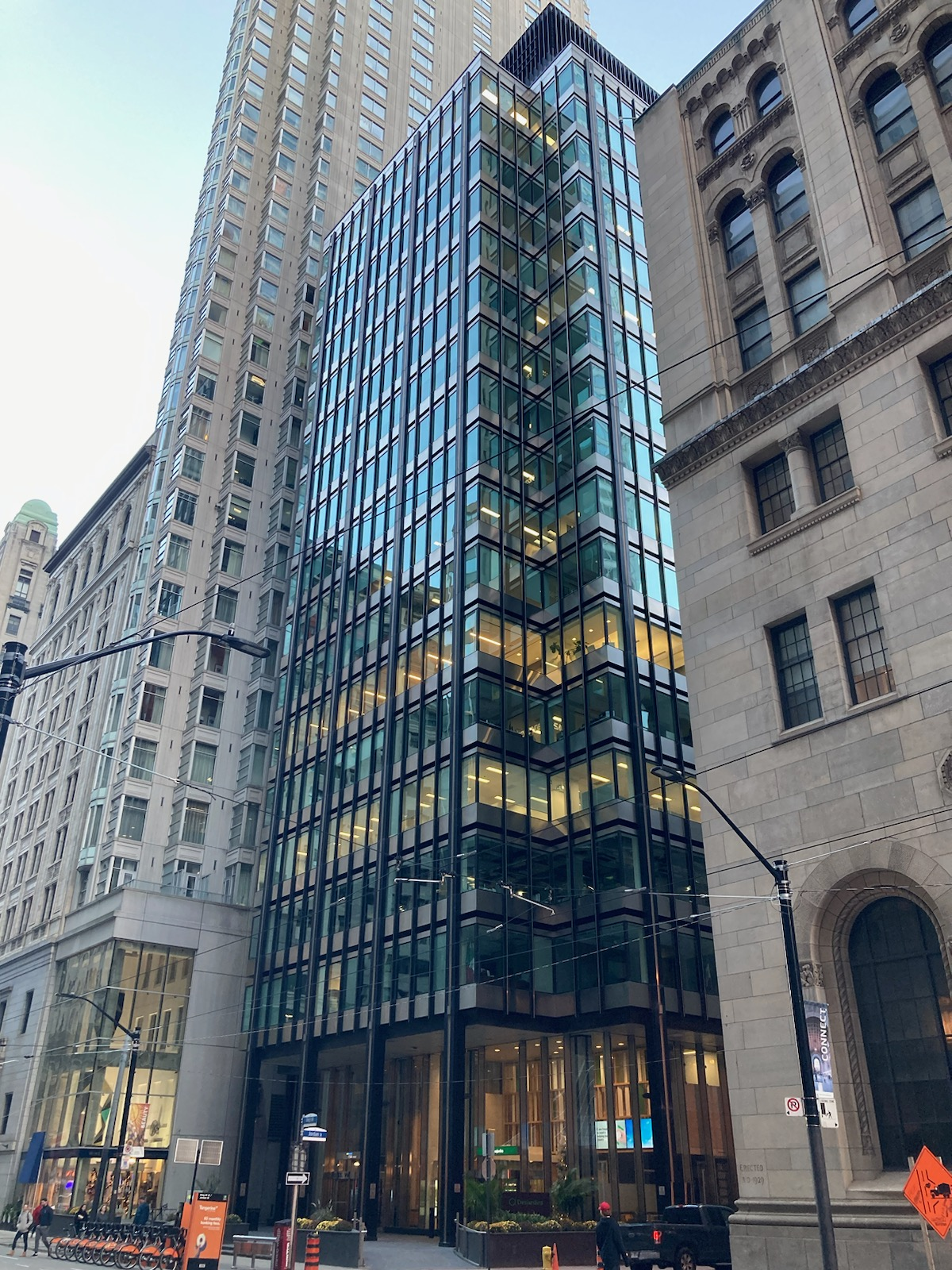
The 1965 Montreal Trust Building at 11 King Street West in Toronto, designed by Page & Steele. It was built on the site of the former Standard Bank.

=== BCE ownership, 1989–1994 ===
In March 1989, BCE reached an agreement with Power Corporation to purchase Power's 63.8 per cent share of Montreal Trust. Per the arrangement, Power would receive a package of cash and BCE shares worth $547 million, and BCE would acquire the minority shareholders stock for $23.50 per, bringing the total purchase price to $875 million. By late April, BCE held more than 99 per cent of Montreal Trust shares. At Montreal Trust's annual meeting in May of that year, BCE installed four directors on the board, while the representatives from Power Corporation stepped down.

During the course of BCE's ownership, Montreal Trustco lost huge amounts of money. In 1992, the company lost $78.8 million in connection to its loans to Olympia and York and Bramalea. Then, in the second quarter of 1993, it lost $22.8 million in connection with holdings of Royal Trustco and General Trustco.

=== Scotiabank subsidiary, 1994–present ===
In the summer of 1993, BCE hired Dominion Securities to seek a buyer for Montreal Trustco. The Canadian Imperial Bank of Commerce, the Bank of Nova Scotia, and a third unidentified party expressed interest in Montreal Trustco, with CIBC rumoured to be the leading contender. However, in December, the Bank of Nova Scotia won the stakes for the company in a deal worth $292 million paid in 10 million common shares of the bank. The deal concluded on 11 April 1994. After the purchase, Robert Chisholm replaced John D. Thompson as president.

== Leadership ==
=== President ===
1. The Lord Strathcona, 1889–1899
2. George Hague, 1899–1904
3. James Pawley Dawes, 1904–1905
4. Richard Wilson-Smith, 1905–1907
5. George Edward Drummond, 1907–1908
6. Robert Archer, 1908
7. Sir Herbert Samuel Holt, 1908–1941
8. Frederick George Donaldson, 1941–1946
9. Wilbert Harvard Howard, 1946–1951
10. Osmond Buckland Thornton, 1951–1962
11. Donald Edward Kerlin, 1962–1967
12. Frank Elliott Case, 1967–1971
13. Gordon Walter Hodgson, 1971–1973
14. Paul Britton Paine, 1973–1982
15. Robert Gratton, 1982–1989
16. John Douglas Thompson, 1989–1994

=== Chairman of the Board ===
1. Wilbert Harvard Howard, 1951–1962
2. Osmond Buckland Thornton, 1962–1967
3. Stuart Ashton Cobbett, 1967–1971
4. Frank Elliott Case, 1971–1975
5. Paul Britton Paine, 1975–1982
6. Robert Gratton, 1982–1989
7. Joseph Victor Raymond Cyr, 1989–1994
