= PanAgora Asset Management =

Asset management firm based in Boston

PanAgora Asset Management, Inc.

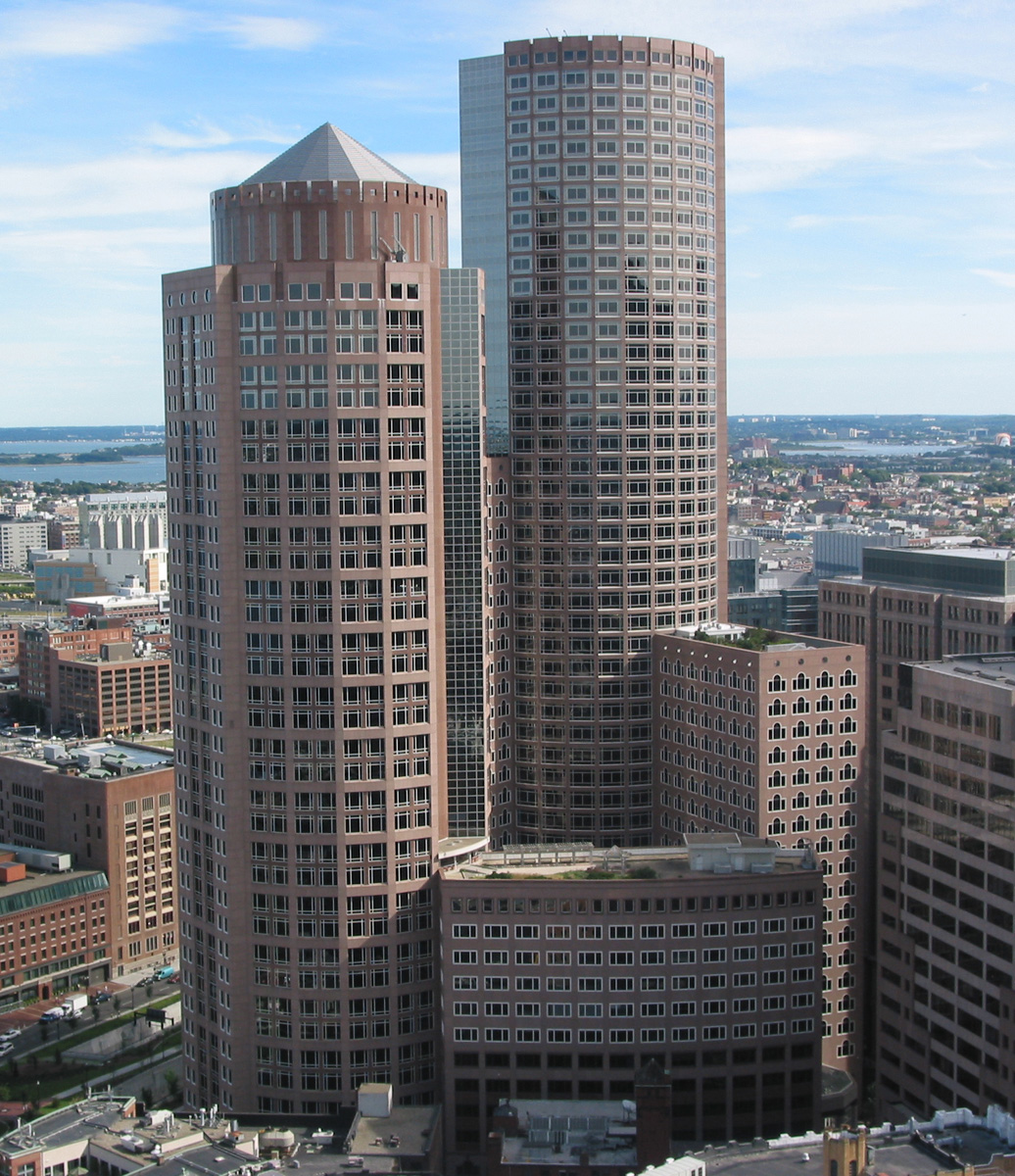
- Headquarters at One International Place
- Company type: Subsidiary
- Industry: Investment Management
- Founded: 1989; 37 years ago
- Founders: Richard A. Crowell
- Headquarters: One International Place, Boston, Massachusetts, U.S.
- Key people: Bryan Belton (President and CEO)
- AUM: US$44 billion (March 31, 2022)
- Number of employees: 126 (2022)
- Parent: Power Financial (Ultimate Parent); Great-West Lifeco (Direct Parent)
- Website: www.panagora.com

PanAgora Asset Management (PanAgora) is an American investment management firm based in Boston. The firm is noted for its usage of quantitative analysis in its approach to investing. It is a direct subsidiary of Great-West Lifeco and its ultimate parent is Power Financial.

== Background ==
PanAgora was founded in 1989 by Richard A. Crowell. Crowell is considered to be one of the early pioneers of quantitative investing. When the firm was founded, Crowell made sure all of its strategies were quantitative. However, later on the firm also incorporated the use of behavioral economics to perform analysis.

PanAgora originally was a 50-50 joint venture between Shearson Lehman Brothers and Nippon Life. In 1997, Putnam Investments acquired 50% of PanAgora from the shareholder now named Lehman Brothers. On August 22, 1998, Crowell died from cancer at 57.

PanAgora opened an office in London in 1990 which oversaw around $800 million in assets, mainly for European pension funds. However, by 1998, the London office was closed due to lack of profitability. PanAgora and DZ Bank formed a joint venture called DG PanAgora in 1998. PanAgora exited the joint venture in 2008 by selling its stake to Union Investment, the investment arm of DZ Bank.

In 2004, Eric Sorensen joined PanAgora from Putnam Investments and is currently the president and CEO of the firm. In the same year, Putnam Investments acquired an additional 30% stake of PanAgora from Nippon Life increasing its holding to 80%. In 2018, Putnam Investments acquired the remaining 20% stake of PanAgora from Nippon Life.

== Ownership ==
PanAgora was directly owned by Putnam Investments which was owned by Great-West Lifeco and ultimately owned by Power Financial. On May 31, 2023, Great-West Lifeco announced that Franklin Templeton Investments would acquire Putnam Investments for $925 million. PanAgora would not be included in the acquisition and would remain under Great-West Lifeco.

The term Risk parity was coined by Edward Qian in a paper written in 2004. Qian is currently Chief investment officer of Multi Asset Investments at PanAgora.
