= Jeffry Hall Brock =

Canadian businessman

- Born: January 6, 1850; Guelph, Canada West
- Died: March 27, 1915 (aged 65); Long Beach, California, U.S.
- Occupation: Businessman
- Known for: founder of Great-West Lifeco, St. Charles Country Club, Manitoba Liberal Party
- Spouse: Louisa Adelaide Clara Gillespie (m. 1876–1915)
- Children: 12

Jeffry Hall Brock (1850–1915) was a Canadian businessman who was also politically active at the time of John A. Macdonald. He had a significant influence on the Canadian insurance industry (Great-West Life turned out to be the second biggest insurance conglomerate in Canada, started the first Western Canada based insurance company), and politics (rallied against high tariffs and the railway monopoly). During his tenure as managing director of Great-West Life, the company's share of sales in Canada's insurance market rose from 0.5% to 13.8%.

He is a member of the Canadian Business Hall of Fame Companions.

== Personal life ==
He grew up in Guelph, Canada West and is the son of Thomas Rees Brock and Eleanor Thompson, and brother to William Rees (a partner in Ogilvy & Company). He attended both public and private schools in Guelph. The youngest of 11 children, he showed a strong interest in business and entrepreneurship early on, selling things at the age of 15, four years before moving to the United States where he worked as a salesman in St. Louis, Missouri. After some time there he left for New York where he became a business representative for R. G. Dunn & Company (he left Guelph almost immediately after finishing high school). In 1876 when he was living in Toronto he married Louisa Gillespie, his only wife with whom he had 12 children. His strong views regarding the ease of doing business in western Canada and being against monopolies (which resulted in high insurance premiums) led him to politics where he helped found the liberal party of Manitoba. He also served as acting warden of Holy Trinity Anglican Church, joined Manitoba Health by appointment in 1893 and was director of the Northern Trusts Company, in 1905 became a founding member of the St. Charles Country Club.

Four of his children pre-deceased him.

== Business life ==
He was a business executive in Troy, New York for RG Dunn & Company for three years from 1869 to 1872, then moved to Toronto to help his brother William Rees at Ogilvy and Company until 1877 when he and his brother started a dry goods business called W. R. Brock and Brother in Winnipeg but he didn't move to Winnipeg until George Frederick Carruthers offered him a partnership position in a major insurance company.

In 1890/1891 he founded Great-West Life, a direct response to rising discontent in Western Canada with the insurance industry (all of them were based in Eastern Canada and Canadian companies represented only 29% of the industry, that caused premiums to be very high). He started the insurance company also because development by farmers and retailers in Western Canada needed capital funding and Jeffrey Brock, who had a relationship with farmers and other business people, wanted to help them. He supervised the young, fast-growing company which expanded to Eastern Canada in 1895 when it acquired Saint John based Dominion Safety Fund Life Association and the United States in 1906 when it began operating in North Dakota (American business became separate from Canadian operations in 1979 and became The Great-West Life & Annuity Insurance Company). Great-West Life was incorporated on August 28, 1891; Brock led the company alongside Winnipeg mayor Alexander Macdonald who was its first president.
