= Putnam Investments =

American investment management firm

- Type: Subsidiary
- Industry: Financial services
- Founded: 1937; 89 years ago
- Headquarters: 100 Federal Street; Boston, Massachusetts
- Products: 401(k)s, mutual funds, retirement plans
- AUM: US$142 billion (November 2023)
- Number of employees: 1,200 (May 2023)
- Parent: Franklin Templeton Investments
- Website: www.putnam.com

Putnam Investments is an investment management firm founded in 1937 by George Putnam, who established one of the first balanced mutual funds, The George Putnam Fund of Boston.

Headquartered in Boston, Massachusetts, it has offices in London, Tokyo, Frankfurt, Sydney, and Singapore. Putnam is currently a subsidiary of Franklin Templeton Investments.

== History ==
The firm was founded in 1937 by George Putnam, who established one of the first balanced mutual funds: The George Putnam Fund of Boston. Lawrence Lasser joined the company in 1969, and it became "one of the largest managers of mutual funds."

In 1997, Putnam Investments established a connection with Nippon Life Insurance in Osaka, Japan, and its subsidiary Nissay Asset Management Company.

=== 2000 to 2006 ===
The year 2000 marked the beginning of a gradual asset value decline that took Putnam's asset value from $400 billion to $192 billion.

In October 2003, the Securities and Exchange Commission (SEC) and the Massachusetts Secretary of State each filed separate civil complaints against Putnam, alleging that the company's portfolio managers, along with some preferred clients, had engaged in the rapid trading of some of Putnam's mutual funds. A few days later, Lasser resigned, and Charles "Ed" Haldeman, director of one of the company's investment divisions, was promoted to chief executive. In early 2004, the company admitted allowing its portfolio managers and some investors to market time its funds. Under agreements with the SEC and the Secretary of the Commonwealth of Massachusetts, Putnam paid $110 million in fines and restitution to settle charges with the state and federal regulators. After allegations of improper trading became public, Putnam's investors withdrew at least $28 billion from its stock and bond funds over six months. By May, 70 civil actions had been filed against Putnam for allegedly engaging in improper trading.

Between 2003 and 2007, Haldeman initiated broad changes within the company. He created a new set of guiding principles for the company and reduced the company's staff by 11 percent, including eliminating 25 of the highest-paid executive positions. He reduced senior management compensation to half of what it was in 2000 and adjusted portfolio managers' compensation to encourage more long-term thinking and planning.

In 2005, Putnam paid $40 million to settle charges made in 2003 that it "did not tell fund investors or directors about paying" brokerage firms for recommending its mutual funds to clients. Afterward, some investors withdrew their funds. This settlement was the final resolution in an investigation of Putnam's payments to 80 brokers conducted over three years.

In 2006, 48 percent of Putnam's mutual funds scored in the top 50 percent compared with funds in their peer group, an increase of 8 percent from two years prior. However, that same year, an SEC lawsuit accused several former employees, including their transfer agency chief, of "defrauding several mutual funds and a corporate retirement plan of $4 million" so they could "cover up an investment-processing error." The lawsuit was about an asset transfer to the Cardinal Health plan that was intentionally delayed by one day in January 2001. After failing to take advantage of a $4 million windfall, Putnam executives covered up the incident and attributed the loss to other mutual funds.

=== 2007 to Present ===
In February 2007, Great-West Lifeco, which is controlled by Power Corporation of Canada, announced it would acquire Putnam Investments, a "troubled mutual fund manager," from the Marsh & McLennan Companies for the approximate price of $3.9 billion. The acquisition of Putnam was motivated by Great-West Lifeco's 2005 decision to expand into the United States. The following month, Putnam received the 2007 Optimas Award for Ethical Practice in recognition of its then-recent efforts to create a more ethical company culture.

In June 2007, two of Putnam's former managing directors agreed to each pay a $400,000 civil penalty to settle charges of improper trading of mutual fund shares, according to the Securities and Exchange Commission. The two directors also agreed to a one-year suspension from any role as an investment advisor. They settled their charges without any admission or denial of guilt. That same month, Lasser, Putnam's former chief executive, agreed to pay $75,000 as a settlement against accusations by the Security and Exchanges Commission that he "failed to disclose that the investment company used fund assets to pay brokerage firms for preferred marketing agreements."

In 2008, Haldeman was replaced by Robert L. Reynolds who was named president and chief executive officer of Putnam Investments. In November, Reynolds told the Financial Times that he would restructure the company by merging several equity funds, basing compensation on performance, and laying off 47 workers including managers.

On September 18, 2008, Putnam directors voted to liquidate its $12.3 billion Putnam Prime Money Market Fund and return capital to its approximately 155 professional investors. According to a statement issued by the company, the decision came as a result of "significant redemption pressure." The fund's board of trustees decided that "selling assets to meet redemption [obligations] would risk losses for the remaining investors."

In 2009, according to a Putnam press release, Reynolds designed a 10-point plan and launched an effort calling for public and private collaboration to strengthen the nation's retirement system. That year, Putnam launched the industry's first suite of absolute return funds available to U.S. retail investors and re-entered the institutional defined contribution business with a 401(k) product offering.

In 2011, Putnam received the DALBAR Service Award for the 21st consecutive year for "industry leading service to shareholders and financial professionals."

On May 31, 2023, Great-West Lifeco announced that Franklin Templeton Investments would acquire Putnam for $925 million. PanAgora Asset Management which was a Putnam subsidiary at the time, would not be included in the acquisition. The deal was completed in January 2024.
