= Mackenzie Investments =

Canadian investment management firm

- Company type: Subsidiary
- Industry: Financial services
- Founded: 1967; 59 years ago
- Founder: Alex Christ
- Headquarters: 180 Queen Street West; Toronto, Ontario; M5V 3K1
- Key people: Luke Gould (president & CEO); Steve Locke (Chief Investment Officer, Fixed Income & Multi-Asset Strategies); Rhonda Goldberg (Executive VP, General Counsel); Gary N. Chateram (Senior VP, Head of Retail Distribution)
- Products: Mutual funds Group Plans; Structured Products; Private Client Program; Segregated funds Managed Asset Programs other Investment Products
- Number of employees: 5,000
- Parent: IGM Financial Inc.
- Website: www.mackenzieinvestments.com

Mackenzie Investments was founded in 1967 and is one of Canada's largest investment management firms by assets under management. Mackenzie Investments provides investment advisory and related services for retail and institutional clients. With $201.1 billion in assets under management, Mackenzie Investments distributes its services through a diversified network of third-party financial advisors. Mackenzie Investments is a member of the IGM Financial Inc. (TSX: IGM) group of companies. IGM Financial is one of Canada's largest financial services companies by assets with over $262 billion in total assets under management. (Note: All figures as of June 30, 2021)

== History ==
- 1967 – Mackenzie Investments was founded by Alex Christ
- 1967 – Mackenzie Investments created company's first mutual fund, the Industrial Growth Fund (later renamed Mackenzie Growth Fund)
- 1973 – Mackenzie Investments went public with a listing on the TSX
- 1977 – Mackenzie Investments bought a stake in Universal Group of Funds
- 1992 – Mackenzie Investments acquired Ivy Management Inc
- 1993 – Mackenzie Investments acquired the balance of Universal Group of Funds
- 1998 – Mackenzie Investments acquired Cundill Funds Inc.
- 2001 – Mackenzie Investments was acquired by Investors Group to create IGM Financial
- 2006 – Mackenzie Investments acquires Cundill Investment Research Ltd. and its affiliates (The Cundill Group)
- 2008 – Mackenzie Investments acquired Howson Tattersall Investment Counsel and the Saxon Group of Mutual Funds
- 2011 – Mackenzie Investments announces that it has reached an agreement with B2B Trust, a subsidiary of Laurentian Bank under which B2B Trust will acquire the MRS Companies (MRS Trust, MRS Inc and MRS Securities Inc.) The transaction is expected to close in November 2011 subject to applicable regulatory notifications and approvals.
- 2012 – Mackenzie Investments completes the sale of the MRS Companies (MRS Trust, MRS Inc and MRS Securities Inc.) to B2B Trust, a subsidiary of Laurentian Bank
- 2013 – Mackenzie Investments announced a proposal to simplify and restructure its product offering through the renaming and merger of several funds as well as the amendment of investment objectives for additional funds. Further, several fund brands will be eliminated.

== Mackenzie Investments Charitable Foundation ==
The Mackenzie Investments Charitable Foundation was established in 1999, funded with an endowed gift of $2.3 million from Mackenzie Investments. The Foundation is an employee-driven, non-profit organization that coordinates community giving and donation activities on behalf of the Mackenzie Group of Companies. The Foundation is funded by donations from Mackenzie Investments' employees, clients and the corporation.
