= Power Corporation of Canada =

Canadian management and holding company

- Type: Public
- Traded as: TSX: POW
- Industry: Conglomerate
- Founded: 18 April 1925
- Founders: Arthur J. Nesbitt; Peter A. T. Thomson
- Headquarters: Montreal, Quebec
- Products: Financial services, insurance and wealth management
- Revenue: ▲CA$64.61 billion (2020)
- Net income: ▲CA$1.99 billion (2020)
- AUM: ▲CA$260.4 billion (Q1 2023)
- Total assets: ▲CA$629.10 billion (2020)
- Number of employees: 30,000+ employees (2020)
- Subsidiaries: Power Financial
- Website: PowerCorporation.com

Power Corporation of Canada (PCC) is a Canadian company founded in 1925. Initially focused on the electric utility and similar industries, it has since become a holding company with an emphasis on financial services across North America, Europe and Asia. PCC holdings include businesses in insurance, retirement services, wealth management, investment management and alternative investments.

== History ==
Power Corporation of Canada was formed in 1925 by stockbrokers Arthur J. Nesbitt and Peter A.T. Thomson with Nesbitt serving as its first president. Power Corporation was created as a holding company to oversee investments in public utility businesses, particularly those operating in the electrical power industry in Quebec's Eastern Townships, and other Canadian provinces, including Ontario, Manitoba, New Brunswick and British Columbia. During the late 1930s, the company expanded its controlling interest in Bathurst Pulp and Paper Company Ltd., and in 1938, Canadian Oil Companies Ltd., selling the latter to Shell Oil Company in 1962.

In 1952, Arthur J. Nesbitt was succeeded as president by his son, Arthur Deane Nesbitt (1910-1978). In 1966, Clarence E. Atchison became the second President of Investors Group. In 1968, control of Power Corporation shifted when the Nesbitt family sold most of its interest to a group led by Paul Desmarais, and by 1970 the family was no longer involved in the company’s operations.

In 1975, PCC attempted a takeover of the Argus Corporation holding company with interests in sectors including brewing, retail, farm implements manufacturing, paper products and other businesses. The proposed takeover was not completed, as Argus’s controlling shareholders retained their voting shares; however, Power Corporation acquired approximately 50% of the non-voting shares. In 1976, ten percent of the voting shares were sold by E. P. Taylor to Desmarais. Argus was eventually sold in 1978 to a Conrad Black-controlled firm. In 1989, corporation began supporting the Imagine Canada program.

While PCC was originally established as an electric utility holding company, the company became a conglomerate with interests in the finance industry, as well as interests in other business sectors such as sustainable and renewable energy. 1984 saw the creation of a management and holding company, Power Financial Corporation. Expansion for the group began in the 1970s, in Europe and followed in the 1990s, in Asia. The group's involvement in the finance sector continued in 2000, with the acquisition of Canada Life, Mackenzie Financial and Putnam Investments. Following the 2020 reorganization, Power Corporation owns 100% of Power Financial's common shares.

In 2002, Power Corporation created the Sagard SAS fund, then Sagard Capital Partners, later named Sagard Holdings, in 2004, in the United States. R. Jeffrey Orr was named Power Financial Corporation CEO in 2005. By 2007, IGM Financial was the holding company for Power Corporation's investment fund companies. Power Corporation also by 2009 had interests in the parent company of La Presse, Mackenzie Financial, London Life Insurance, Canada Life Assurance, Great-West Life, and Putnam Investments.

The company reduced its number of board directors in 2008 from 21 to 12. Power Corporation acquired a stake in China Asset Management in 2011, purchasing 10% from CITIC Securities Co. Also that year, Power Corporation's new fund Sagard China was founded. Through a number of recent initiatives, in partnership with its subsidiaries Great-West Lifeco and IGM Financial, the Power Corporation group has been actively participating in the emerging fintech industry. This fintech strategy is achieved through Portage Ventures (which launched a fintech-focused investment fund), Wealthsimple, Personal Capital and Diagram.

In connection with the reorganization, Paul Desmarais Jr. and Andre Desmarais retired as co-chief executive officers of Power Corporation after 24 years in the roles and continue to serve as chairman and deputy chairman, respectively, of Power Corporation's board of directors. R. Jeffrey Orr, president and chief executive officer of Power Financial, became president and chief executive officer of Power Corporation, effective February 13, 2020.

Following the announcement made in February 2026, Jeffrey Orr became Vice-Chairman of Power Corporation in July 2026, and James O'Sullivan was appointed President and Chief Executive Officer.

== Political connections and commentary ==
Power Corporation has been the subject of commentary regarding its relationships with political figures in Canada. Media coverage has noted connections between individuals associated with the company and former public officials. According to a 2007 report by The New York Times, critics have at times alleged that the Desmarais family's political connections may provide advantages to the company. The company has been known to defend federalism in Quebec.

Paul Desmarais Jr. was a member of the North American Competitiveness Council, a body that provided recommendations related to the Security and Prosperity Partnership of North America (SPP). Several former Canadian prime ministers and senior political figures have held roles within Power Corporation, its subsidiaries, or its advisory bodies.

Paul Martin former Prime Minister of Canada was hired the 1960s under Paul Desmarais Sr., reportedly through Maurice Strong. Martin later became president of Canada Steamship Lines, a subsidiary of Power Corporation. In 1981, Desmarais sold the company to Martin and a partner, after which Martin accumulated personal wealth as its owner.

Former prime minister of Canada Jean Chretien served on the board of Consolidated Bathurst, a subsidiary of Power Corporation, in the late 1980s prior to becoming leader of the Liberal Party of Canada. Chrétien’s daughter, France Chrétien, is married to André Desmarais, son of Paul Desmarais Sr. Chrétien’s longtime aide Eddie Goldenberg and strategist John Rae also held positions at Power Corporation. John Rae is the brother of Bob Rae.

Pierre Trudeau served on the company’s international advisory board in the mid-1990s. His assistant, Ted Johnson, was also associated with the company. During and after Trudeau’s tenure in government, Michael Pitfield held roles in both the public sector and later served as a vice-chairman of Power Corporation.

Brian Mulroney has also been associated with the company. His relationship with Paul Desmarais Sr. has been described in media accounts, and Mulroney is reported to have undertaken legal work for Power Corporation following his time in office. Former Minister of Transport Don Mazankowski later served as a director of the company.

Former Ontario premiers Bill Davis and John Robarts served on Power Corporation’s national advisory board. Former Quebec premier Daniel Johnson Jr. worked at the company from 1973 to 1981, including a period as vice president.

Maurice Strong served as president of Power Corporation at a relatively young age and later held roles in the establishment of the Canadian International Development Agency and leadership of Petro-Canada, as well as positions within the United Nations.

The company’s international advisory board has included figures such as Helmut Schmidt, Ahmed Zaki Yamani, Paul Volcker, and Pierre Trudeau.

Henri-Paul Rousseau, former president and CEO of the Caisse de dépôt et placement du Québec, served as vice chairman of both Power Corporation of Canada and Power Financial Corporation from 2009 to January 2018.

== Leadership ==
=== Presidents ===
| Name | Tenure |
|---|---|
| Arthur James Nesbitt | 1925–1954 |
| Peter Alfred Thomas Thomson | 1954–1957 |
| Arthur Deane Nesbitt | 1957–1962 |
| Peter Nesbitt Thomson | 1962–1965 |
| Maurice Frederick Strong | 1965–1966 |
| William Ian Mackenzie Turner Jr. | 1966–1970 |
| Jean Parisien | 1970–1972 |
| Peter Duncan Curry | 1972–1978 |
| James William Burns | 1978–1986 |
| Arthur Francis Knowles | 1986–1991 |
| Andre Desmarais | 1991–2020 |
| Robert Jeffrey Orr | 2020–2026 |
| James O’Sullivan | 2026–present |

=== Chairmen of the Board ===
| Name | Tenure |
|---|---|
| James Blain Woodyatt | 1957–1962 |
| Peter Nesbitt Thomson | 1962–1968 |
| Paul Desmarais | 1968–1996 |
| Paul Desmarais Jr. | 1996–present |

== See also ==
- List of United States insurance companies
- List of Canadian insurance companies

== Bibliography ==
- Nesbitt, A. R. Deane (1989). Dry Goods & Pickles: The Story of Nesbitt, Thomson. Toronto: Nesbitt. ISBN 0-9694148-0-3.
- Rohmer, Richard (1978). E. P. Taylor : the biography of Edward Plunket Taylor. McClelland & Stewart. ISBN 0-7710-7709-2.
