= James W. Burns =

Canadian businessman (1921–2019)

- Born: 27 December 1929; Winnipeg, Manitoba
- Died: 11 February 2019 (aged 89); Winnipeg, Manitoba
- Education: University of Manitoba (BCom 1951); Harvard University (MBA 1953)
- Spouse: Barbara Mary Copeland (m. 1953)

James William Burns OC OM (27 December 1929 – 11 February 2019) was a director emeritus at the Power Corporation of Canada. He was an Officer of the Order of Canada. Burns's contribution to the nation as well as his hometown of Winnipeg, Manitoba, has earned him national recognition and distinction. His latest project involved the construction of a state-of-the-art skateboard park in downtown Winnipeg. He died in Winnipeg on February 11, 2019.

== Education ==
Burns attended the Harvard Graduate School of Business Administration, where he received a Master of Business Administration degree. He also attended the University of Manitoba, earning a Doctor of Laws.

== Previous positions ==
The Great-West Life Assurance Co. – chr. Power Financial Corp. – chr. and CEO Power Corp. of Canada – pres. The Great-West Life Assurance Co. – pres. and CEO
