= Yves Aubry =

Canadian ornithologist

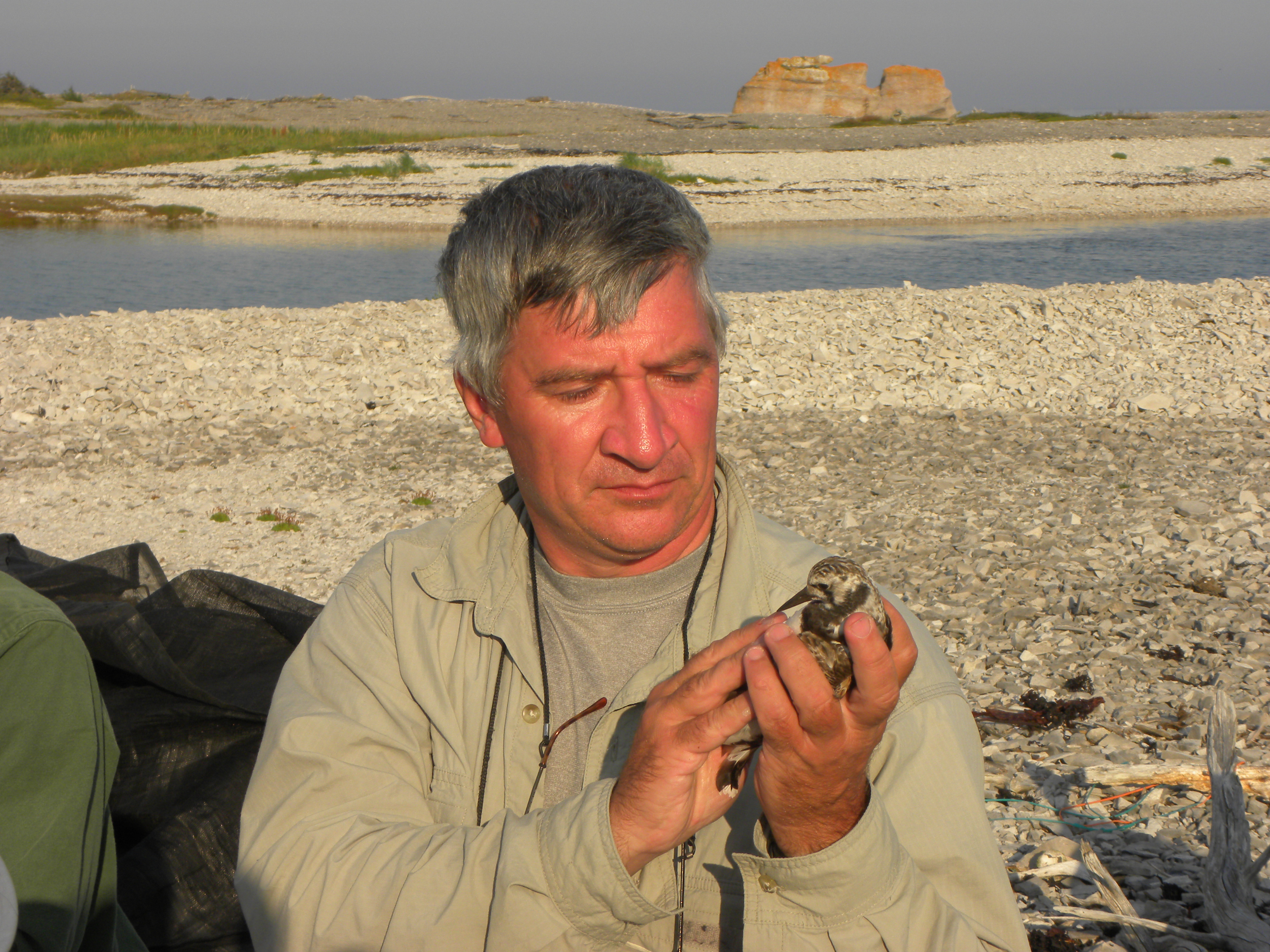
Yves Aubry

Yves Aubry is a Canadian ornithologist.

He graduated from Université Laval. He is co-editor of the ornithology reference, "L'Atlas des oiseaux nicheurs du Québec méridional", published in 1995. He is a member of Centre d'Étude de la Forêt.

== Works ==
- Gauthier J. and Aubry Y. (eds.) 1996. The breeding birds of Québec: atlas of the breeding birds of southern Québec. Association Québécoise des Groupes d'Ornithologues, Province of Québec Society for the Protection of Birds, Canadian Wildlife Service, Environnement Canada (Québec region), Montréal, Québec, Canada.
- Hobson K.A., Aubry Y. and Wassenaar L.I. 2004. Migratory connectivity in Bicknell's Thrush: Locating missing populations with hydrogen isotopes. Condor 106: 905–909.
- Rimmer C.C.; Mcfarland K.P.; Evers D.C.; Miller E.K.; Aubry Y.; Busby D. & Taylor R.J. (March 2005). "Mercury concentrations in Bicknell's Thrush and other insectivorous passerines in montane forests of northeastern North America". Ecotoxicology. 14 (1–2): 223–40. Bibcode:2005Ecotx..14..223R. doi:10.1007/s10646-004-6270-1. ISSN 0963-9292. PMID 15931968. S2CID 21531295.
