= 2009 Canadian honours =

Canadian government recognitions

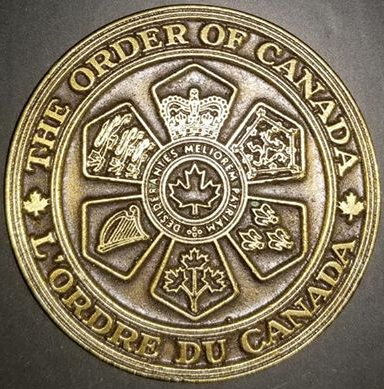
The Seal of the Order of Canada

The following are the appointments to various Canadian Honours of 2009. Usually, they are announced as part of the New Year and Canada Day celebrations and are published within the Canada Gazette during year. This follows the custom set out within the United Kingdom which publishes its appoints of various British Honours for New Year's and for monarch's official birthday. However, instead of the midyear appointments announced on Victoria Day, the official birthday of the Canadian Monarch, this custom has been transferred with the celebration of Canadian Confederation and the creation of the Order of Canada.

However, as the Canada Gazette publishes appointment to various orders, decorations and medal, either Canadian or from Commonwealth and foreign states, this article will reference all Canadians so honoured during the 2009 calendar year.

Provincial Honours are not listed within the Canada Gazette, however they are listed within the various publications of each provincial government. Provincial honours are listed within the page.

== The Order of Merit ==
- The Right Honourable Joseph Jacques Jean Chrétien, PC OM CC QC

== The Order of Canada ==
=== Companions of the Order of Canada ===
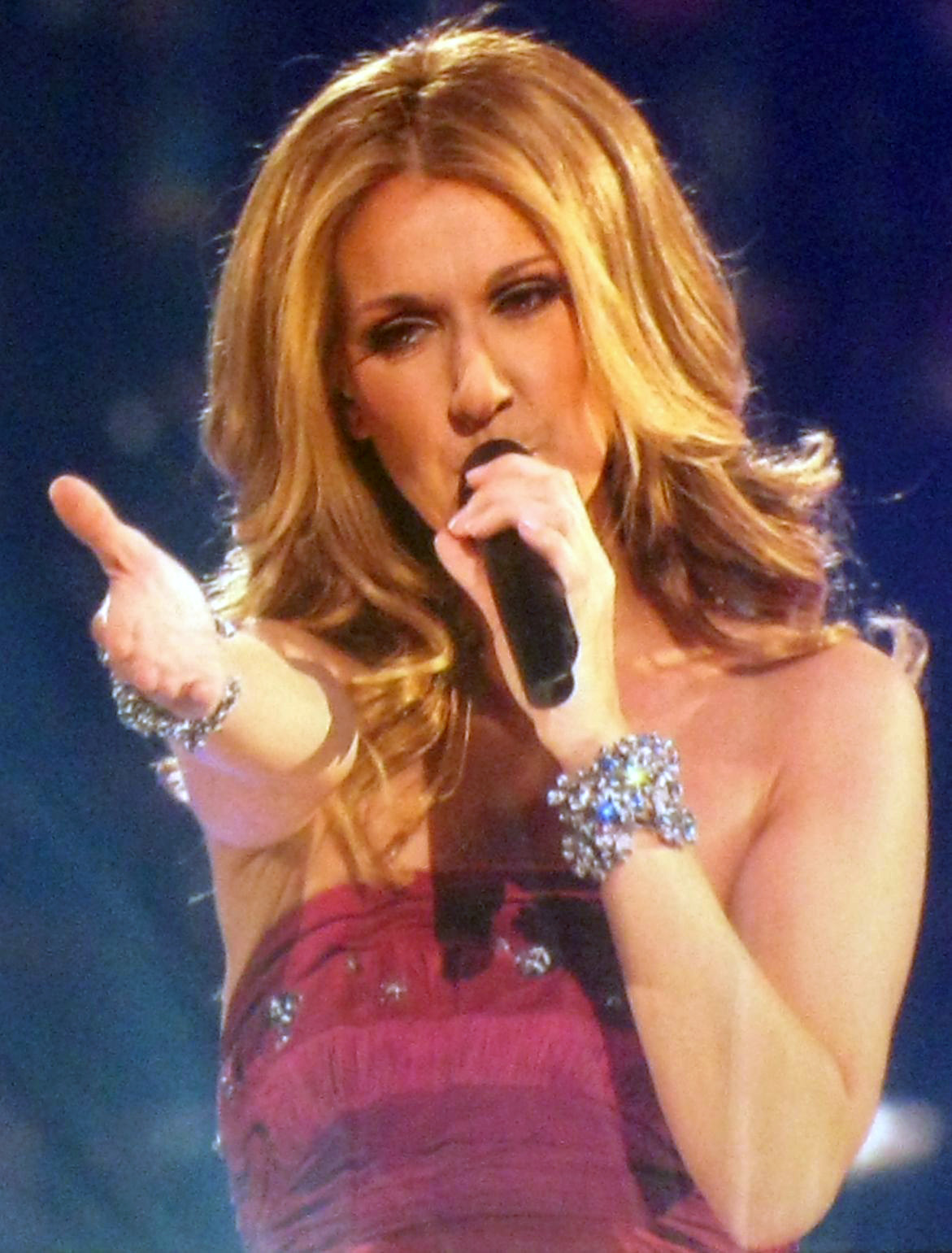
Céline Dion, promoted to the rank of Companion of the Order of Canada

- Céline Dion, C.C., O.Q. - This is a promotion within the Order
- Ben Heppner, C.C. - This is a promotion within the Order
- Stephen A. Jarislowsky, C.C., G.O.Q. - This is a promotion within the Order
- Peter Munk, C.C. - This is a promotion within the Order
- The Honourable Michel Bastarache, C.C.

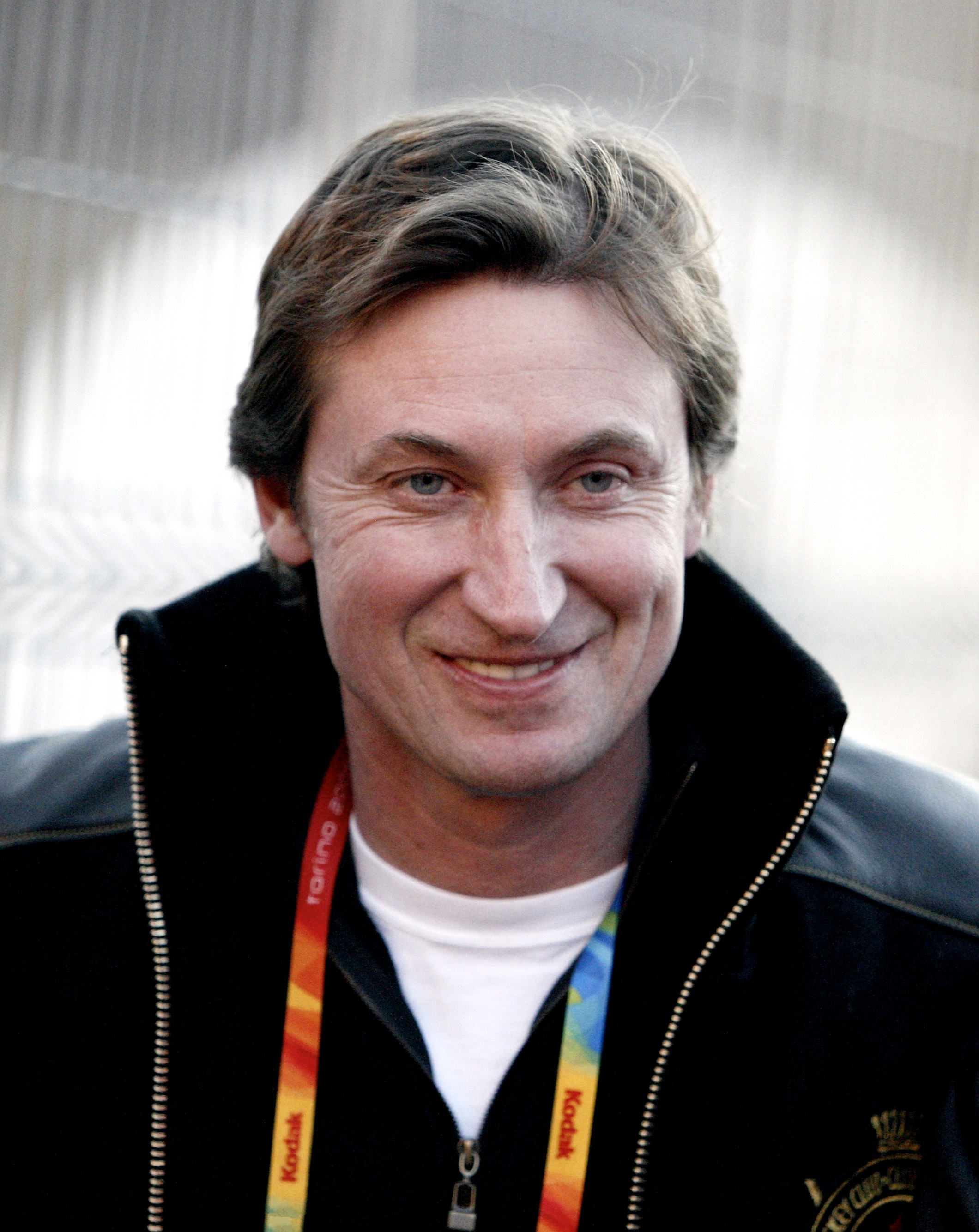
Wayne Gretzky, promoted to the rank of Companion of the Order of Canada

- Wayne Gretzky, C.C. - This is a promotion within the Order
- Harley Norman Hotchkiss, C.C., A.O.E. - This is a promotion within the Order
- Robert Lepage, C.C., O.Q. - This is a promotion within the Order

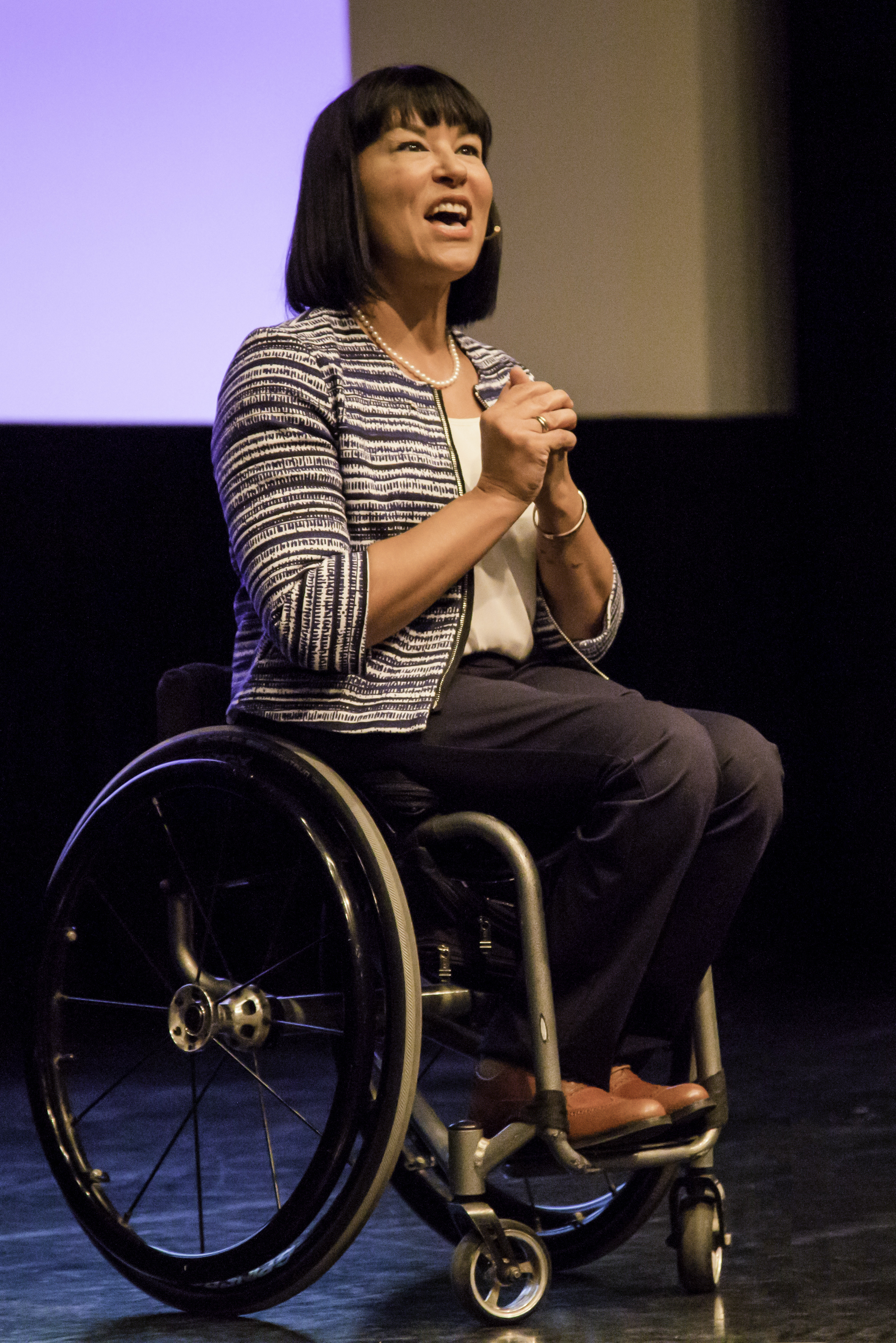
Chantal Petitclerc, Companion of the Order of Canada

- Chantal Petitclerc, C.C., C.Q., M.S.M.

=== Honorary Officer of the Order of Canada ===
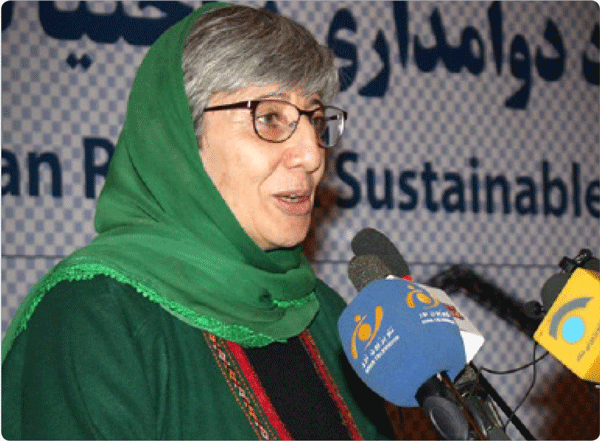
Human rights advocate, activist Seema Samar appointed as an honorary Officer of the Order of Canada.

- Sima Samar, O.C.

=== Officer of the Order of Canada ===
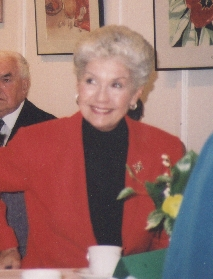
The 27th Lieutenant Governor of British Columbia Iona Victoria Campagnolo, was a member of the Order of Canada since 1973, and promoted in 2009 to the rank of officer.

- Gary Birch, O.C.
- The Honourable Iona V. Campagnolo, P.C., O.C., O.B.C. * This is a promotion within the Order
- William J. Commanda, O.C.
- Paul E. Garfinkel, O.C.
- Dave Joe, O.C.
- The Honourable Michael J. Kirby, O.C.
- Arvind Koshal, O.C.
- Claude R. Lamoureux, O.C.
- Louise Lecavalier, O.C.

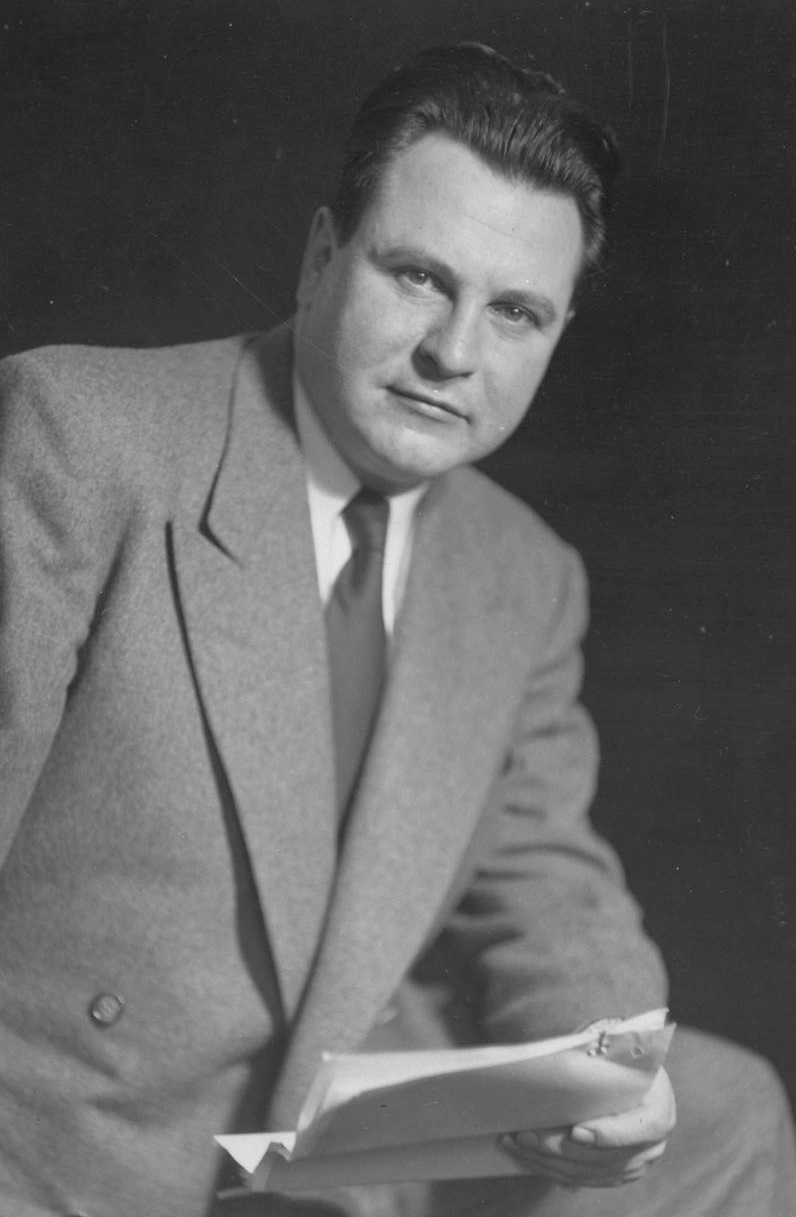
The first deputy prime minister of Canada and former senator, the Honourable Allan Joseph MacEachen, officer of the Order of Canada

- The Honourable Allan J. MacEachen, P.C., O.C.
- David P. O'Brien, O.C.
- Ian C.P. Smith, O.C.
- The Honourable Barry L. Strayer, O.C.
- George Hector Beaton, O.C.
- Ian Bruce, O.C.
- John W. Crow, O.C.

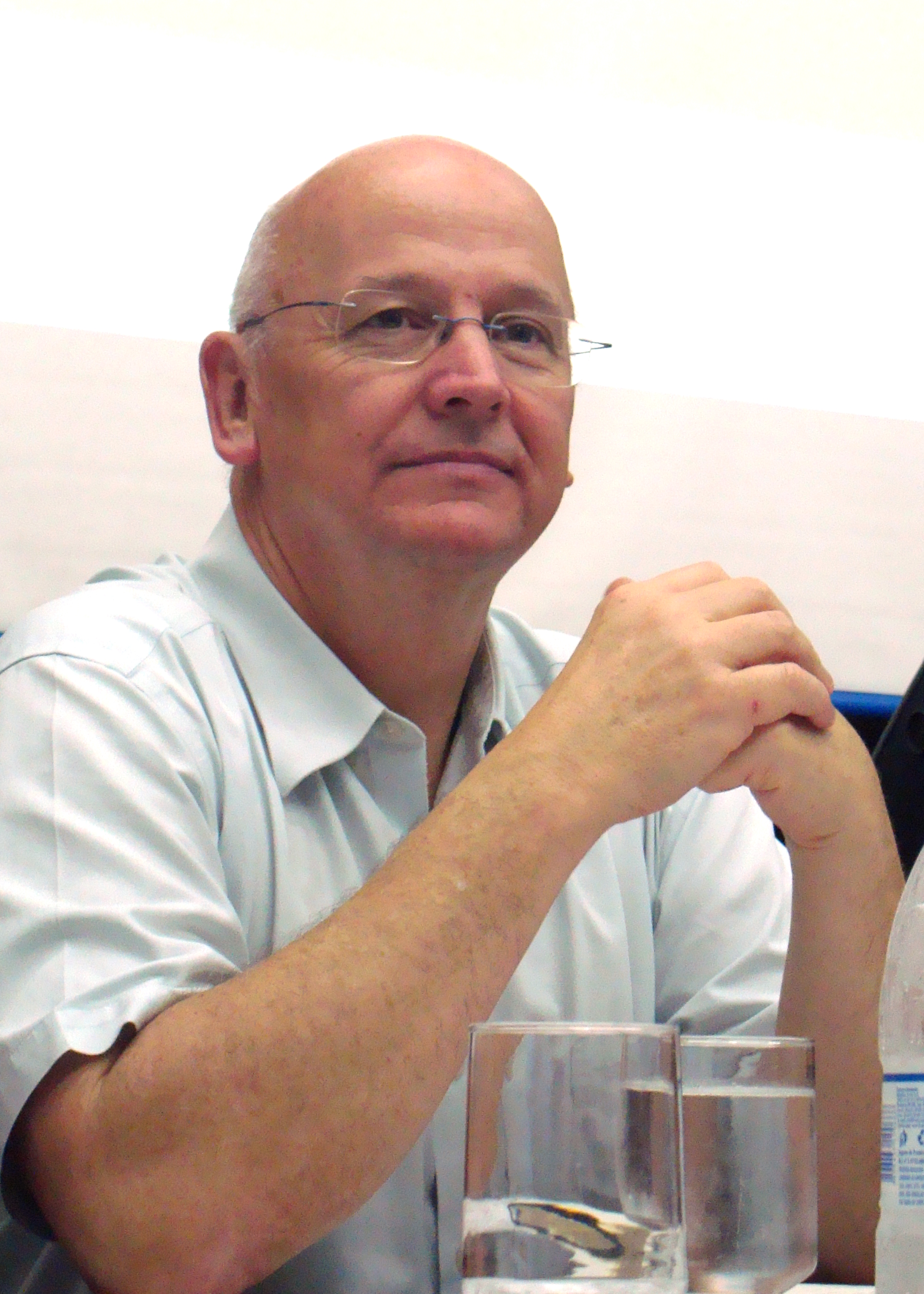
Catholic priest and Benedictine monk Laurence Freeman, appointed as an Officer of the Order of Canada

- Laurence Freeman, O.C., O.S.B.
- Crawford Stanley Holling, O.C.
- Peter Jaffe, O.C. Peter Jaffe, O.C.
- Donald K. Johnson, O.C. - This is a promotion within the Order
- Anita Kunz, O.C.
- The Honourable Sterling R. Lyon, P.C., O.C.

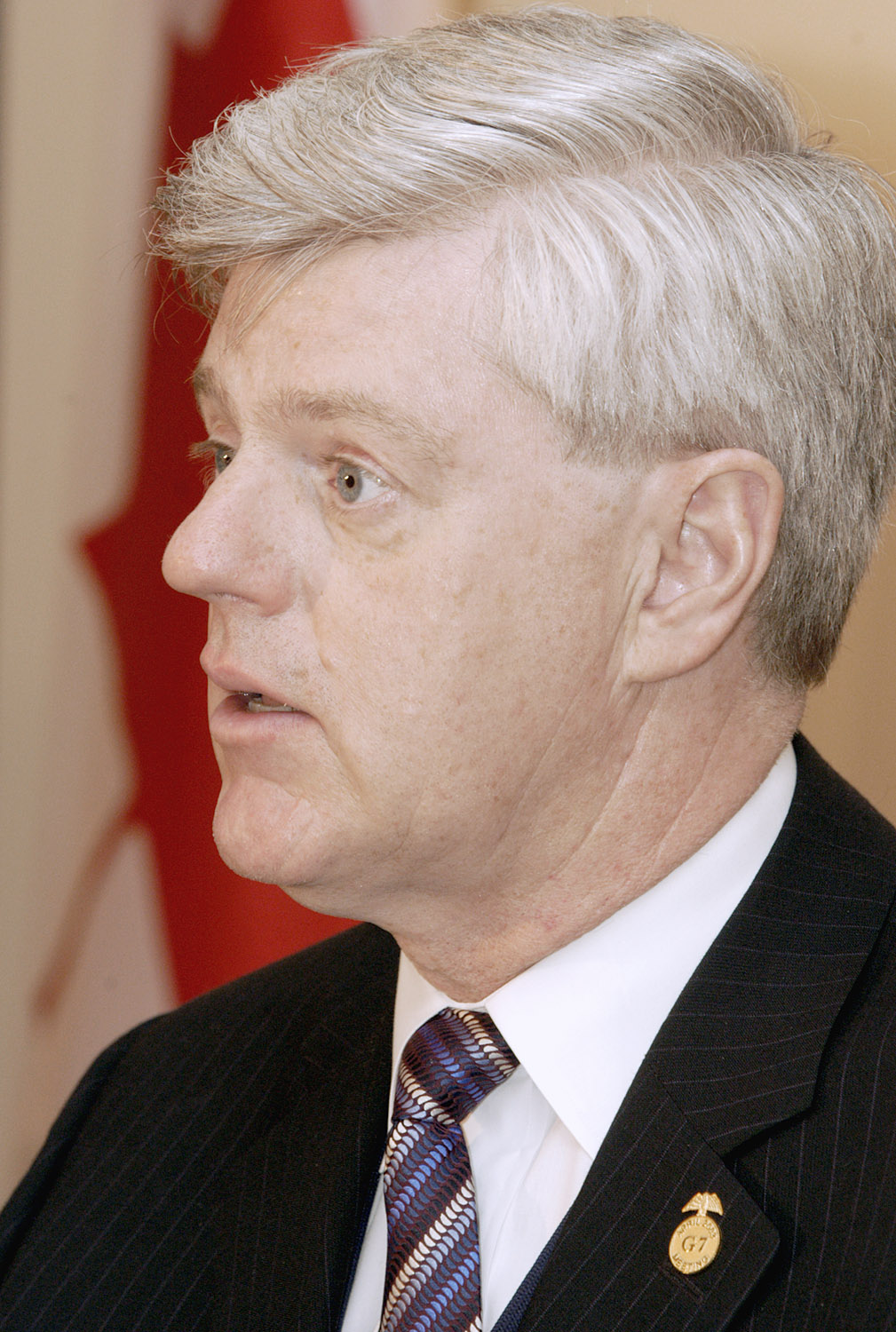
Former Deputy Prime Minister John Manley, appointed as an Officer of the Order of Canada

- The Honourable John P. Manley, P.C., O.C.

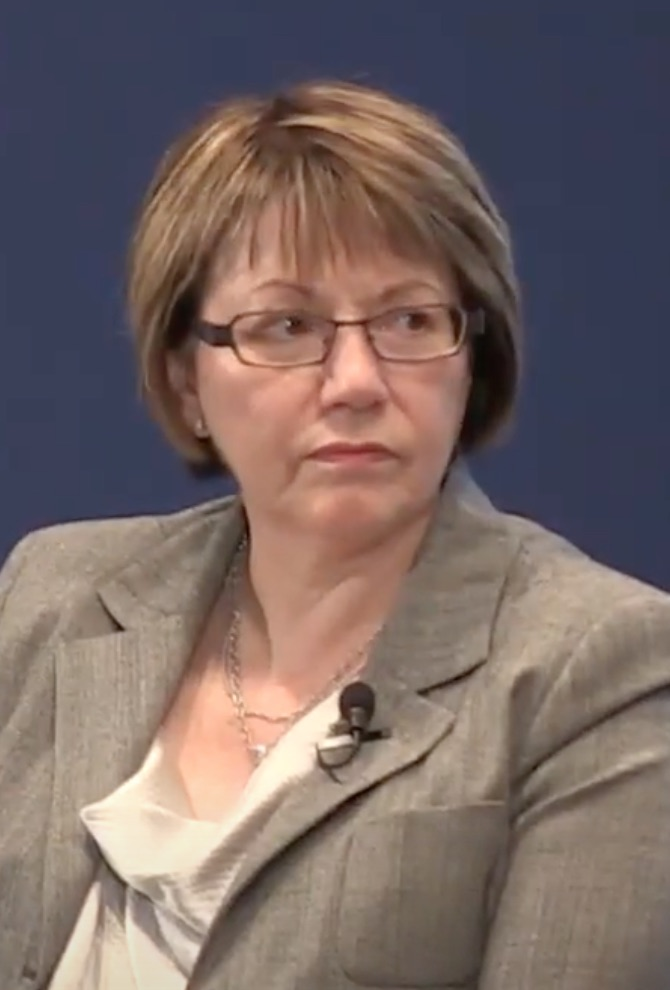
Former Deputy Prime Minister Anne McLellan, appointed as an Officer of the Order of Canada

- The Honourable A. Anne McLellan, P.C., O.C.
- The Honourable Roland Roy McMurtry, O.C., O.Ont.
- Wajdi Mouawad, O.C. Wajdi Mouawad, O.C.
- Cornelia Hahn Oberlander, O.C. - This is a promotion within the Order
- Jack Rabinovitch, O.C., O.Ont. - This is a promotion within the Order
- Françoise Sullivan, O.C., C.Q. - This is a promotion within the Order
- Donald Winston Thompson, O.C.

=== Honorary Member of the Order of Canada ===
- Zachary Richard, C.M.

=== Members of the Order of Canada ===
- Michael A. Baker, C.M.
- Joyce Barkhouse, C.M., O.N.S.
- Elsa Bolam, C.M.
- David Bouchard, C.M.
- David A. Brown, C.M.
- Dinu Bumbaru, C.M.
- Fred Carmichael, C.M.
- Douglas Cole, C.M.
- Gail Cook-Bennett, C.M.
- Max Cynader, C.M., O.B.C.
- James J. Douglas, C.M.

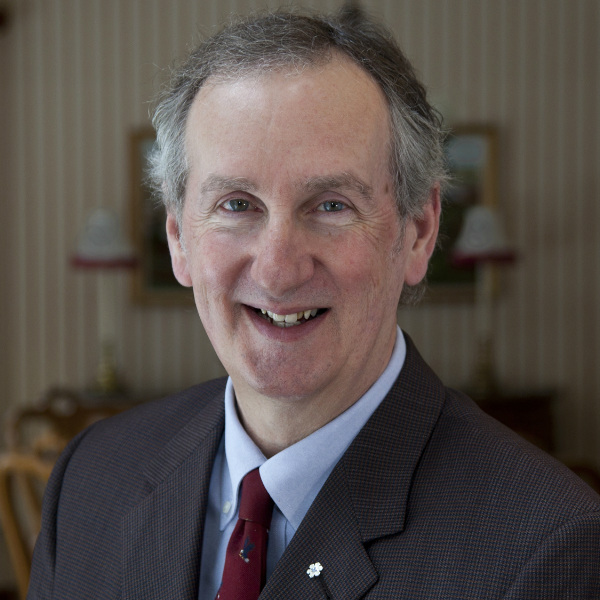
Lawye Frederick Sheldon Fountain, Member of the Order of Canada

- Fred S. Fountain, C.M
- Arlene Haché, C.M.
- Kenneth Kernaghan, C.M.
- M. Azhar Ali Khan, C.M.
- LaVerne Kindree, C.M.

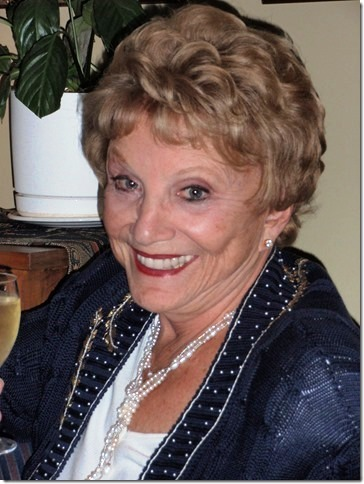
Canadian singer, actress and television presenter Suzanne Lapoint, Member of the Order of Canada

- Suzanne Lapointe, C.M.
- John F. Lewis, C.M.
- Frank L. Lovsin, C.M.
- David Matas, C.M.
- Gordon A. McBean, C.M.
- Barbara McInnes, C.M.
- Don McKay, C.M.
- James H. Morrison, C.M.
- K. Alexander Nilsson, C.M.
- Allison D. O'Brien, C.M.
- Willie E. O'Ree, C.M., O.N.B.
- Lata Pada, C.M.
- Brian Paisley, C.M.
- Ross E. Petty, C.M.
- Douglas Pollard, C.M.
- Victor M. Power, C.M.
- Elinor Gill Ratcliffe, C.M., O.N.L.
- Angela Rebeiro, C.M.
- Henry P. Rourke, C.M.
- The Honourable Herbert O. Sparrow, C.M.
- Donald W. Storch, C.M.
- David Thauberger, C.M.
- Pierre Théroux, C.M.
- William J. Wall, C.M.
- Shirley Westeinde, C.M.
- Carolyn Anne Baker, C.M.
- Stan Bevington, C.M.
- Melvin James Boutilier, C.M.
- Deane Cameron, C.M.
- Savvas Chamberlain, C.M.
- Archie Charles, C.M.
- Victor Cicansky, C.M.
- Ian D. Clark, C.M.
- Hélène Desmarais, C.M.
- Patrick Doherty, C.M.
- Maureen Doherty, C.M.
- George Gate, C.M.
- Daniel Germain, C.M., C.Q., M.S.M.
- A. Alan Giachino, C.M.
- Susan Jane Glass, C.M.
- Shirley E. Greenberg, C.M.
- David Helwig, C.M.
- Jack Stanley Hodgins, C.M.
- Jay Ingram, C.M.
- Winston Kassim, C.M.
- Krishna Kumar, C.M., S.O.M.
- Claude Lebouthillier, C.M.
- Roderick R. McInnes, C.M.
- Sylvio Michaud, C.M.
- Mahmood A. Naqvi, C.M., O.N.S.
- Jean O'Neil, C.M., C.Q.
- Roland Priddle, C.M.
- Edward Moxon Roberts, C.M.
- Paul Stubbing, C.M.
- Peter Ridgway Taylor, C.M.
- Ian MacEwan Thom, C.M.
- Marvin Tile, C.M.
- Nancy Turner, C.M.
- Jeanne Mary Wolfe, C.M.
- Donald Alcoe Young, C.M.
- Madeline Ziniak, C.M., O.Ont.

=== Termination of an appointment to the Order of Canada ===
- T. Sher Singh
- René Racine
- Jacqueline Richard
- Cardinal Jean-Claude Turcotte

== Order of Military Merit ==
=== Commanders of the Order of Military Merit ===
Undress ribbon for a Commander of the Order of Military Merit

- Major-General C. J. R. Davis, C.M.M., C.D.
- Major-General A. G. Hines, C.M.M., C.D. - This is a promotion within the Order
- Vice-Admiral Joseph Alphonse Denis Rouleau, C.M.M., M.S.M., C.D. - This is a promotion within the Order
- Major General W. Semianiw, C.M.M., M.S.C., C.D. - This is a promotion within the Order
- Major-General D. C. Tabbernor, C.M.M., C.D. - This is a promotion within the Order

=== Officers of the Order of Military Merit ===
Undress ribbon for an Officer of the Order of Military Merit

- Colonel L. E. Aitken, O.M.M., C.D.
- Brigadier-General J. G. J. C. Barabé, O.M.M., C.D.
- Colonel S. A. Becker, O.M.M., C.D.
- Colonel F. M. Boomer, O.M.M., C.D.
- Colonel K. R. Cotten, O.M.M., C.D.
- Lieutenant-Colonel T. M. Crosby, O.M.M., C.D.
- Lieutenant-Colonel R. Jetly, O.M.M., C.D.
- Colonel J. C. G. Juneau, O.M.M., M.S.M., C.D.
- Colonel C. R. King, O.M.M., C.D., M.B.E.
- Colonel R. Lapointe, O.M.M., C.D.
- Colonel D. D. Marshall, O.M.M., C.D.
- Colonel R. G. Mazzolin, O.M.M., C.D.
- Colonel B. A. McQuade, O.M.M., C.D.
- Major B. D. Milligan, O.M.M., C.D.
- Colonel J. A. J. Parent, O.M.M., C.D.
- Commander J. R. L. Pelletier, O.M.M., C.D.
- Captain L. P. Phillips, O.M.M., C.D.
- Lieutenant-Colonel G. M. Pratt, O.M.M., C.D.
- Captain(N) D. L. Sing, O.M.M., C.D.

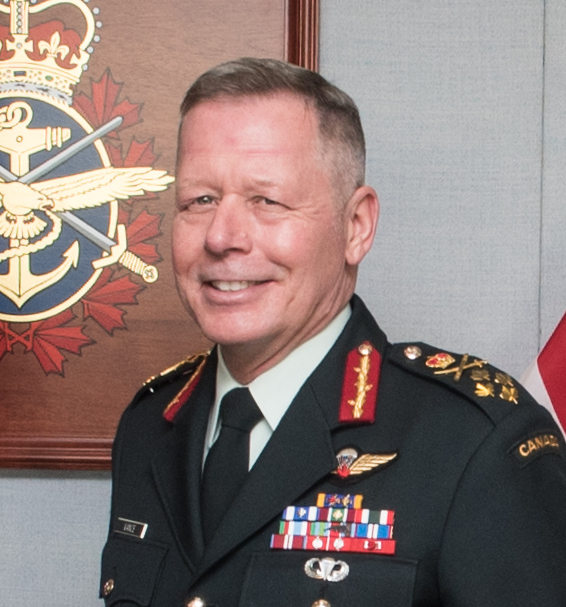
Future Chief of Defence Staff (Canada) Jonathan Holbert Vance, as a colonel, was appointed within the Order of Military Merit (Canada). He would be promoted as a Commander within the Order in 2013.

- Colonel J. H. Vance, O.M.M., C.D.
- Major E. M. Vaughan, O.M.M., C.D.
- Colonel K. L. Woiden, O.M.M., C.D.

=== Members of the Order of Military Merit ===
Undress ribbon for a Member of the Order of Military Merit

- Chief Warrant Officer G. D. Alex, M.M.M., C.D.
- Chief Warrant Officer A. G. Atwell, M.M.M., C.D.
- Master Warrant Officer D. A. Badgerow, M.M.M., C.D.
- Master Warrant Officer D. F. Bates, M.M.M., C.D.
- Major W. J. Beaudoin, M.M.M., C.D.
- Warrant Officer L. R. Canam, M.M.M., C.D.
- Corporal J. T. Chalmer, M.M.M., C.D.
- Warrant Officer M. B. L. Chassé, M.M.M., C.D.
- Chief Petty Officer 2nd Class R. B. Clark-McKay, M.M.M., C.D.
- Sergeant J. G. D. Cloutier, M.M.M., C.D.
- Sergeant A. C. Comé, M.M.M., C.D.
- Chief Warrant Officer J. M. J. C. Cournoyer, M.M.M., C.D.
- Chief Warrant Officer D. W. Coxall, M.M.M., C.D.
- Master Warrant Officer D. J. Curtis, M.M.M., M.S.M., C.D.
- Chief Warrant Officer J. F. G. Daigle, M.M.M., C.D.
- Chief Warrant Officer J. W. Dalke, M.M.M., C.D.
- Warrant Officer G. P. Della Valle, M.M.M., C.D.
- Sergeant K. G. Dickson, M.M.M., C.D.
- Major P. A. Douglass, M.M.M., C.D.
- Chief Warrant Officer K. G. Drew, M.M.M., C.D.
- Captain R. B. Dueck, M.M.M., C.D.
- Petty Officer 1st Class P. R. Egli, M.M.M., C.D.
- Sergeant S. R. Elliston, M.M.M., C.D.
- Chief Warrant Officer D. W. Ells, M.M.M., C.D.
- Chief Petty Officer 1st Class B. F. Fisher, M.M.M., C.D.
- Chief Warrant Officer J. P. C. Fortin, M.M.M., C.D.
- Captain D. P. Gayton, M.M.M., C.D. L
- Lieutenant-Commander J. M. P. Godin, M.M.M., C.D.
- Lieutenant-Commander P. M. Gould, M.M.M., C.D.
- Warrant Officer J. M. L. Guillemette, M.M.M., C.D.
- Master Warrant Officer B. F. Gutoskie, M.M.M., C.D.
- Sergeant D. F. Haley, M.M.M., C.D.
- Chief Warrant Officer J. K. Hamalainen, M.M.M., C.D.
- Captain P. J. Hillier, M.M.M., C.D.
- Chief Warrant Officer G. A. Hughes, M.M.M., C.D.
- Master Warrant Officer G. A. Innis, M.M.M., C.D.
- Chief Petty Officer 2nd Class P. N. Jacobs, M.M.M., C.D.
- Master Warrant Officer J. M. Juraszko, M.M.M., C.D.
- Warrant Officer C. A. Krammer, M.M.M., C.D.
- Captain J. C. R. Labrecque, M.M.M., C.D.
- Chief Warrant Officer J. J. M. Landry, M.M.M., M.S.M., C.D.
- Chief Warrant Officer G. Laverdière, M.M.M., C.D.
- Chief Warrant Officer K. M. Lee, M.M.M., C.D.
- Master Warrant Officer K. L. Lewis, M.M.M., C.D.
- Lieutenant-Commander R. D. Leyte, M.M.M., C.D.
- Chief Warrant Officer D. G. Libby, M.M.M., C.D.
- Chief Warrant Officer L. J. Limoges, M.M.M., C.D.
- Master Warrant Officer J. G. Lizotte, M.M.M., C.D.
- Master Warrant Officer M. P. Manoukarakis, M.M.M., C.D.
- Chief Petty Officer 2nd class J. A. R. P. Massé, M.M.M., C.D.
- Warrant Officer W. P. Meuse, M.M.M., C.D.
- Chief Warrant Officer M. H. Miller, M.M.M., C.D.
- Master Warrant Officer W. L. Mooney, M.M.M., C.D.
- Warrant Officer J. V. Murphy, M.M.M., C.D.
- Chief Warrant Officer J. E. D. Noël, M.M.M., C.D.
- Master Warrant Officer W. F. O'Toole, M.M.M., M.S.C., C.D.
- Chief Warrant Officer M. J. Y. Ouellet, M.M.M., C.D.
- Major D. J. Parker, M.M.M., C.D.
- Captain T. M. Pettigrew, M.M.M., C.D.
- Chief Petty Officer 2nd Class C. A. Radimer, M.M.M., C.D.
- Sergeant (Ranger) L. E. Ramsey, M.M.M.
- Chief Petty Officer 2nd Class S. M. Rideout, M.M.M., C.D.
- Master Warrant Officer J. A. R. Rodrigue, M.M.M., C.D.
- Chief Warrant Officer C. P. Rusk, M.M.M., C.D.
- Chief Warrant Officer T. J. Secretan, M.M.M., C.D.
- Master Warrant Officer J. Y. C. M. Séguin, M.M.M., C.D.
- Master Warrant Officer A. W. Simmons, M.M.M., C.D.
- Warrant Officer M. P. Snea, M.M.M., C.D.
- Master Warrant Officer K. H. Stadnick, M.M.M., C.D.
- Master Warrant Officer D. C. Steiger, M.M.M., C.D.
- Major J. K. Stewart, M.M.M., C.D.
- Sergeant (Ranger) A. G. Sutherland, M.M.M.
- Chief Petty Officer 2nd Class A. J. Tiffin, M.M.M., C.D.
- Lieutenant-Commander I. D. Torrie, M.M.M., C.D.
- Chief Warrant Officer N. R. Townsend, M.M.M., C.D.
- Major R. J. A. Tremblay, M.M.M., C.D.
- Lieutenant-Commander B. A. Vallis, M.M.M., C.D.
- Warrant Officer D. Verreault, M.M.M., C.D.
- Master Warrant Officer R. F. Vida, M.M.M., C.D.
- Chief Warrant Officer G. W. Wallace, M.M.M., C.D.
- Chief Warrant Officer P. J. Whelan, M.M.M., C.D.
- Master Warrant Officer P. C. Whipps, M.M.M., C.D.
- Captain I. J. Willis, M.M.M., C.D.

== Order of Merit of the Police Forces ==
=== Officers of the Order of Merit of the Police Forces ===
Undress ribbon of an Officer of the Order of Merit of the Police Forces

- Assistant Commissioner Stephen William Graham - This is a promotion within the Order
- Chief Inspector Jocelyn Latulippe
- Assistant Commissioner Gary R. (Bud) Mercer
- Superintendent Lloyde F. Plante
- Superintendent Michael Jay Sekela

=== Members of the Order of Merit of the Police Forces ===
Undress ribbon of a Member of the Order of Merit of the Police Forces

- Chief Paul Douglas Cook Chef Paul Douglas Cook
- Staff Superintendent Anthony D. Corrie
- Chief R. M. Brent Crowhurst
- Inspector Frederic Leigh DesRoches I
- Provincial Constable Richard J. Ellins
- Staff Superintendent Michael Federico
- Detective Superintendent Ronald James Gentle
- Staff Sergeant Roy H. E. Hill
- Inspector John Clifton House
- Deputy Chief Kenneth John Jackman
- Chief Inspector Luc Lafleur
- Sergeant Jean Lamothe
- Mr. Charles A. R. Lawrence
- Deputy Chief Kenneth James Leendertse
- Acting Sergeant Katherine J. Macdonald
- Staff Sergeant George Frederick Heber Noseworthy
- Provincial Constable Jerry Novack
- Inspector Anthony (Adam) Palmer
- Chief Daniel Colin Parkinson
- Assistant Director Pierre-Paul Pichette
- Deputy Chief Constable Robert D. Rolls
- Staff Sergeant Ian Charles Sanderson
- Staff Superintendent Peter J. M. Sloly
- Assistant Commissioner William Allan Smith
- Staff Sergeant Major William Henry Sparkes
- Constable Linda G. Stewart
- Superintendent Ronald Taverner
- Corporal Spurgeon Kenneth Walker
- Chief Superintendent J. A. M. (Mike) Woods

== Most Venerable Order of the Hospital of St. John of Jerusalem ==
Undress ribbon for all grades of the Most Venerable Order of the Hospital of St. John of Jerusalem

=== Knights and Dames of the Order of St. John ===
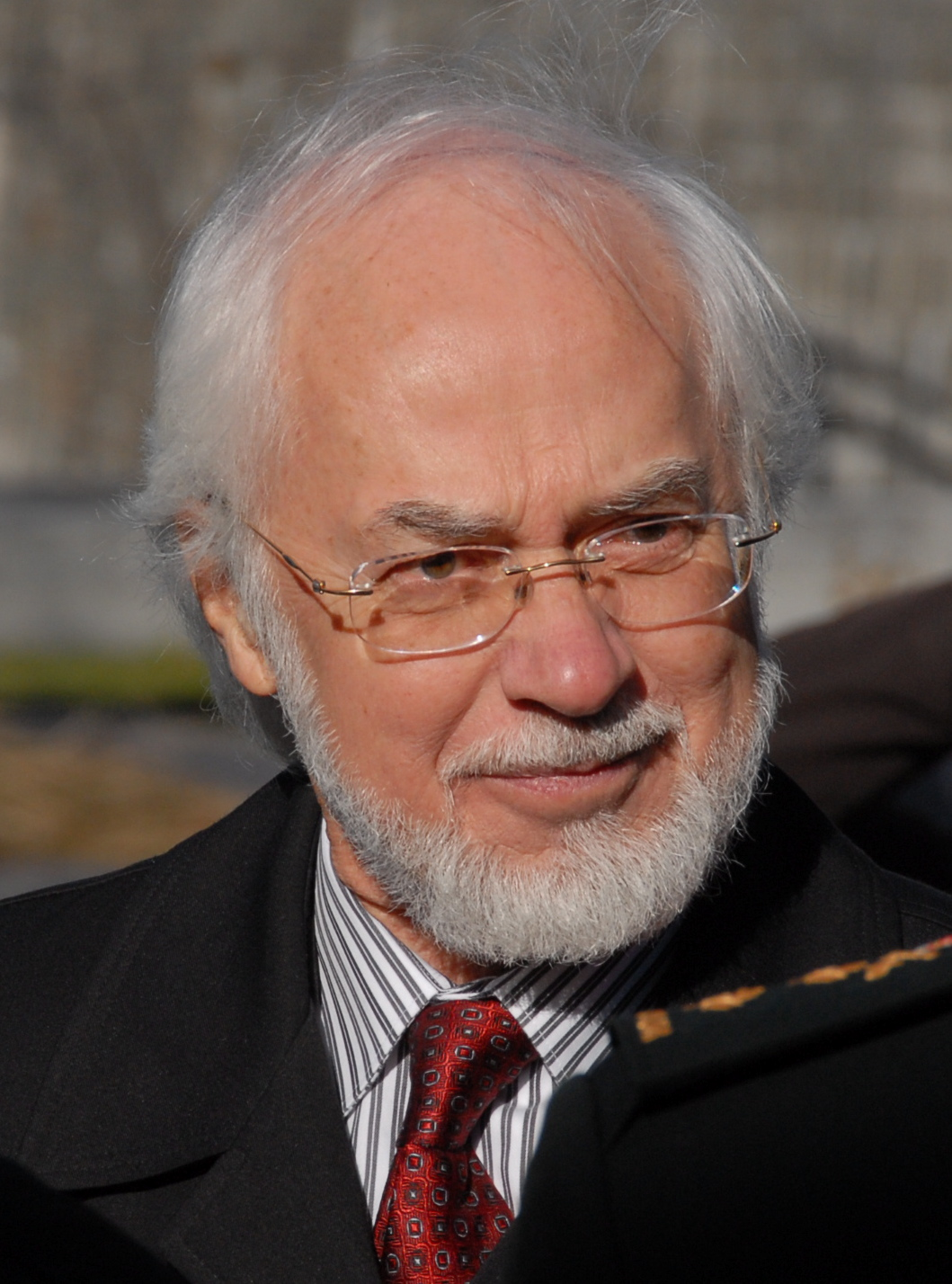
Québec's Lieutenant Governor, the Honourable Pierre Duchesne appointed as a Knight of the Most Venerable Order of the Hospital of St. John of Jerusalem.

- His Honour, the Honourable Pierre Duchesne

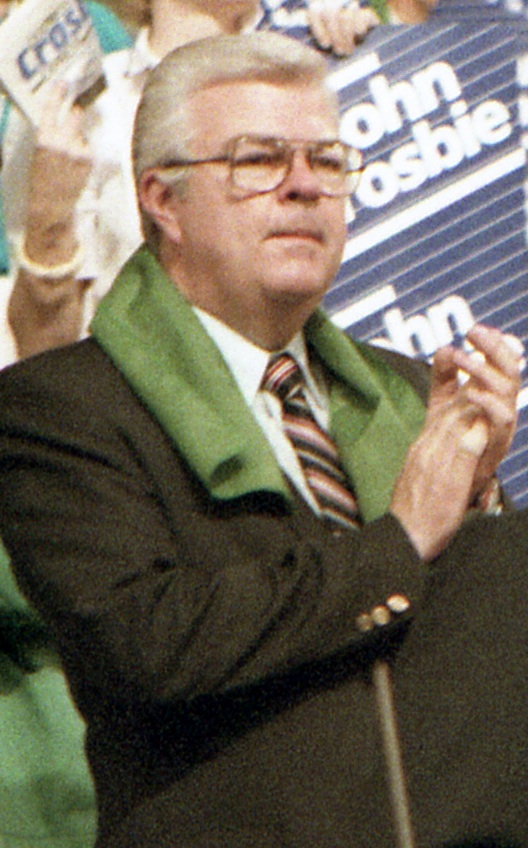
Newfoundland and Labrador's Lieutenant Governor the Honourable John Crosbie appointed as a Knight of the Most Venerable Order of the Hospital of St. John of Jerusalem.

- His Honour, the Honourable John C. Crosbie, P.C., O.N., O.N.L.
- Lieutenant-Colonel (Retired) Pierre Alexandre Bibeau, C.D.
- Major Félix Bouchard, C.D.
- Brigadier-General (Retired) Jean Gervais, C.D.
- Lieutenant Luc Pellerin
- Geoffrey Leonard Wybrew

=== Commanders of the Order of St. John ===
- Mairi Christina Arthur
- Major Richard Choquette, C.D.
- Honorary Colonel Ross Gaudreault
- Robert James Houston, O.M.M., C.D.
- Jim Yuan Lai
- Brigadier-General (Retired) Stewart E. McGowan, C.D.
- Lieutenant-Colonel (Retired) Hugh Patrick Mundell, C.D.

=== Officers of the Order of St. John ===
- Her Honour Ginette Lamoureux
- Her Honour Jane Furneaux Crosbie
- William John Shannon Elliott
- Beverley Busson, C.O.M., O.B.C.
- Catherine Mary Bowlen
- Kirk Woodruff Corkery, C.D.
- Marie Dumais
- Michael Dussault
- Lieutenant (N) Peter B. Ferst, C.D.,
- Andrea Feys
- Juanita M. Hanney
- Brian Allan Kinaschuk
- Dorothy Kay Kirkwood
- Lieutenant-Colonel Keith Michael Lawrence, C.D.
- John Stewart Archibald LeForte
- Captain William Michael Lowe, C.D.,
- Charles R. M. McCormack
- Charles McVicker
- Steven D. Murphy
- Lieutenant (N) Scott Edward Nelson, A.D.C.
- Antonio Pergola
- Timothy Rees
- Russell Scott Reid, C.D.
- Judith-Anne Robinson
- T. Craig Wilson
- Raymond Tze Hung Woo

=== Members of the Order of St. John ===
- Master Corporal Jacqueline L. Beard
- Marika Lemstra Beaumont
- Gyuszi S. Berki
- Sarah Michelle Bigelow
- Marc Joseph Luc Boucher
- Jun Manghi Cadiente
- Philip John Casimiri
- D. Lorne Charbonneau
- Captain Karina Choquette
- Anthony Chui
- Andrew Collins
- Leigh-Ann E. Cooper
- Captain Shane Crawford, C.D.
- Joseph D. Dallos
- Lucie Dion
- Annie Kim Doyon
- Tiffany Lee Eyre Evans
- Joseph Longueuil Gaspardone
- Sandra Michelle Gaspardone
- Huguette Grondines
- Hélène M. Hawn
- Ryan Jonathan Hendren
- Michael Douglas Gordon Hewitt
- Marie Roseann Hoven
- Mary Mavis Hurley
- Steven Scott Imrie
- Darlene Mae Jedras
- Clarke G. Johnson
- Jo-Ann Rita Johnston
- Mark Leslie Kennedy, C.D.
- Julie Anne Kirke
- Evelyn Eleanor Teresa Kostal
- Alain Lapointe
- Annie Leblanc
- Donald J. LeBlanc
- Miguel Leblanc
- Douglas Gordon Longley
- Paul Owen Lovell
- Angus Rankin F. MacDonald
- Jim F. W. MacKay
- Cindy Carol Maitre
- Warrant Officer John Nayduk
- Master Warrant Officer David Russell Nicolle, C.D.
- Adam Nathan Parker
- Jean Pellerin
- Lieutenant-Colonel Richard Allan Phillips
- David Scott Ryckman
- Sarah Anita Scott
- Carolyn Frances Scrovitch
- Ricci Ritva Anneli Silvo
- Michael David Simpson
- Daphne Eleanor Smith
- Inspector Robert Shinichi Usui
- Margaret Wynn Wicklum

== Provincial Honours ==
=== National Order of Québec ===
==== Grand Officers of the National Order of Québec ====
Undress ribbon for a Grand Officer of the National Order of Québec

- The Honourable Louise Arbour, GOQ
- Brenda Milner, CC, GOQ
- Guy Saint-Pierre, CC, GOQ

==== Officers of the National Order of Québec ====
Undress ribbon for an Officer of the National Order of Québec

- René Angélil, OQ
- André Desmarais, OC, OQ
- Paul Desmarais, Jr. OC, OQ
- Mostafa M. Elhil, OC, OQ
- Céline Galipeau, OQ
- Claude Lamoureux, OC, OQ, O.Ont
- Heather Munroe-Blum, OC, OQ
- Robert Normand, OQ
- Louise Roy, OQ
- Yoav Talmi, OQ

==== Knight of the National Order of Québec ====
Undress ribbon for a Knight of the National Order of Québec

- Pita Aatami, CQ
- Marius Arsenault, CQ
- André Bourbeau, CQ
- Jacques Brown, CQ
- Raymond Carignan, CQ
- Claude Cormier, CQ
- Christiane Germain, CQ
- Margie Gillis, CQ
- Jean-Claude Labrecque, CQ
- Normand Laprise, CQ
- Gilles Latulippe, CM, CQ
- Jean Leclerc, CQ
- Alain Lefèvre, CQ
- Mario Lemieux, CQ
- Franco Lepore, CQ, FRSC
- Nicole Marcil-Gratton, CQ
- Samuel Pierre, CQ
- Michael Sheehan, CQ
- Walter Sieber, CQ
- Martine Tremblay, CQ
- Michèle Viau-Chagnon, CQ

=== Saskatchewan Order of Merit ===
Undress ribbon for a member of the Saskatchewan Order of Merit

- Casimir J. Broda, S.O.M. (1929-2016)
- Dr. Sharon A. Butala, O.C., S.O.M., LL.D.
- Dr. Donald Grant Devine, S.O.M., F.A.I.C.
- Elder Alma Kytwayhat, S.O.M. (1942-2011)
- Harold H. MacKay, O.C., S.O.M., Q.C., LL.B., LL.M., LL.D., F.A.I.C., F.I.C.D.
- Jack MacKenzie, S.O.M.
- Dr. David Millar, S.O.M.
- Arne F. Petersen, S.O.M.
- Linda K. Rudachyk, S.O.M.
- Lorne Scott, C.M., S.O.M.
- William Shurniak, S.O.M., LL.D.
- Geoffrey Ursell, S.O.M.

=== Order of Ontario ===
Undress ribbon for a member of the Order of Ontario

- Constance Backhouse
- Dr. Philip Berger
- Lawrence Bloomberg
- Lesley Jane Boake
- Dr. Helen Chan
- Peter Crossgrove
- Mike DeGagné
- Levente Diosady
- Fraser Dougall
- Jacques Flamand
- Jean Gagnon
- Paul Godfrey
- Peter Godsoe
- Ovid Jackson
- Dr. Kellie Leitch
- Gerry Lougheed, Jr.
- Diana Mady Kelly
- Naseem Mahdi
- Dr. Samantha Nutt
- Dr. James Orbinski
- Bonnie Patterson
- Shirley Peruniak
- Alice Porter
- Ken Shaw
- Janet Stewart
- Shirley Thomson
- George Turnbull
- Dr. Mladen Vranic
- Dr. Anne-Marie Zajdlik

=== Order of British Columbia ===
Undress ribbon for a member of the Order of British Columbia

- Brandt Louie;
- Robert E.W. Hancock;
- Hart Buckendahl;
- Dr. Michael Hayden;
- Peter Dhillon;
- Dr. Ray Markham;
- Leon Bibb
- Dolores Kirkwood;
- Clarence Thomas (Manny) Jules;
- Roy Akira Miki;
- Dr. Linda Warren;
- Sam Belzberg;
- D. Ross Fitzpatrick

=== Alberta Order of Excellence ===
Undress ribbon for a member of the Alberta Order of Excellence

=== Order of Prince Edward Island ===
Undress ribbon for a member of the Order of Prince Edward Island

=== Order of Manitoba ===
Undress ribbon for a member of the Order of Manitoba

=== Order of New Brunswick ===
Undress ribbon for a member of the Order of New Brunswick

=== Order of Nova Scotia ===
Undress ribbon for a member of the Order of Nova Scotia

=== Order of Newfoundland and Labrador ===
Undress ribbon for a member of the Order of Newfoundland and Labrador

== Canadian Bravery Decorations ==
=== Star of Courage ===
Undress ribbon for the Star of Courage

- Sergeant David John Cooper, C.D.
- Petty Officer 2nd Class Drew D. Dazzo
- Constable Christopher George Garrett (posthumous)
- Sergeant Dwayne B. Guay, C.D.
- Petty Officer 2nd Class James Alexander Leith, M.S.M., C.D.
- Mathew B. Vizbulis

=== Medal of Bravery ===
Undress ribbon for the Medal of Bravery

- Ryan Cecil Atwin
- Constable Daniel William Bailey
- Mark Barnard
- Jerrica Lynn Bartlett
- Gerard Beernaerts
- Geneviève Bergeron-Collin
- Deborah Anne Chiborak
- Constable Aaron Courtney
- Michael Cruz
- Marshall Davis
- Sean James Deakin
- Robert Joseph Kyle Donelle
- William Joseph Fitzpatrick
- Evan John Michael Green
- Bonnoir Hadjadj
- Robert Hardy
- Shaun Harper
- Corporal Frédéric Heppell
- Constable Nathalie Hervieux
- Andrew Douglas Hilderman
- Alexander Hrycyk
- John Jew
- Gerry Kuczek
- Wayne Kuczek
- Michael David Landry
- Nicholas Levi Francis Lannigan
- Constable François Lavoie
- G. Gregory Lawlor
- Chris MacLean
- Stephen Mallett
- RCMP Constable James Allan Munro
- Philippe O. Murphy
- OPP Provincial Constable Gino Nolet
- OPP Provincial Constable James D. Orser
- Carol Parent
- Harry Prymak
- Daniel Reynolds
- Robert Ringuette
- Constable Yves Rousseau
- Kelsey Jessica Roy
- Shawn Sangha
- Michel Talbi
- OPP Provincial Constable Bruce A. Thompson
- Tony Neil Tingskou
- David Glenn Virgoe (posthumous)
- OPP Provincial Constable Darrell Wagner
- Mackenzie Ramesh Smythe Walker
- Robert A. Walker
- Caroline Young
- Constable Kevin Wade Zeh

== Meritorious Service Decorations ==
=== Meritorious Service Medal (Military Division) ===
Undress ribbon for the Meritious Service Medal in the military division

- LIEUTENANT-COLONEL LYNDON ANDERSON, M.S.M., AUSTRALIAN ARMY
- COLONEL STEVEN M. CZEPIGA, M.S.M. (Retired), UNITED STATES ARMY
- CHIEF PETTY OFFICER 1ST CLASS MICHAEL PATRICK GOURLEY, M.M.M., M.S.M., C.D.
- MAJOR TREVOR GOSSELIN, M.S.M., C.D.
- MAJOR CHRISTOPHER ROBIN HENDERSON, M.S.M., C.D
- COLONEL BERND HORN, O.M.M., M.S.M., C.D.
- COMMANDER JOSEPH HONORÉ PATRICK ST-DENIS, M.S.M., C.D. (Retired)

=== Secret appointments ===
- Her Excellency the Right Honourable Michaëlle Jean, Governor General and Commander-in-Chief of Canada, on the recommendation of the Chief of the Defence Staff, has awarded one Meritorious Service Cross and four Meritorious Service Medals to members of the Canadian Special Operations Forces Command for military activities of high standard that have brought great honour to the Canadian Forces and to Canada. For security and operational reasons, recipients' names and citations have not been released.

== Commonwealth and Foreign Orders, Decorations and Medal awarded to Canadians ==
=== From Her Majesty The Queen in Right of the United Kingdom ===
==== The Most Excellent Order of the British Empire ====
===== Member =====
- Captain Bryan N. Mialkowsky
- Mr. Colin Ploughman

==== Iraq Medal ====
- Major Scott Douglass Campbell
- Major Timothy Edward Hall

==== Operational Service Medal (Iraq) ====
- Lieutenant-Colonel Malcolm D. Bruce
- Major Daniel J. Dandurand
- Captain Jeremy Keith Alexander Fountain
- Lieutenant-Colonel Robert J. Martin
- Major Eric Thorson
- Lieutenant-Colonel Richard D. Vincent
- Major Paul Gautron

==== Operational Service Medal (Afghanistan) ====
- Master Warrant Officer Douglas K. Loader
- Captain Travis D. Wert

=== From the President of Argentina ===
==== Knight of the Order of May ====
- Mr. Patrick Riley

=== From the President of Austria ===
==== Grand Decoration of Honour in Gold with Star ====
- Mr. Maurice Strong

==== Grand Decoration of Honour ====
- Mr. Jean-Jacques Van Vlasselaer

==== Decoration of Merit in Gold ====
- Mrs. Brigitte Hekers
- Mr. Herbert Wolf
- Mr. Scott Keir Anderson
- Mr. Hans Kroisenbrunner
- Ms. Heidi Temelie

==== Grand Decoration of Honour in Silver with Star ====
- Mr. Laurent Beaudoin

=== From His Majesty The King of the Belgians ===
==== Grand Cross of the Order of the Crown ====
- Mr. Phillippe Kirsch

=== From the President of Colombia ===
==== Grand Cross of the National Order of Merit ====
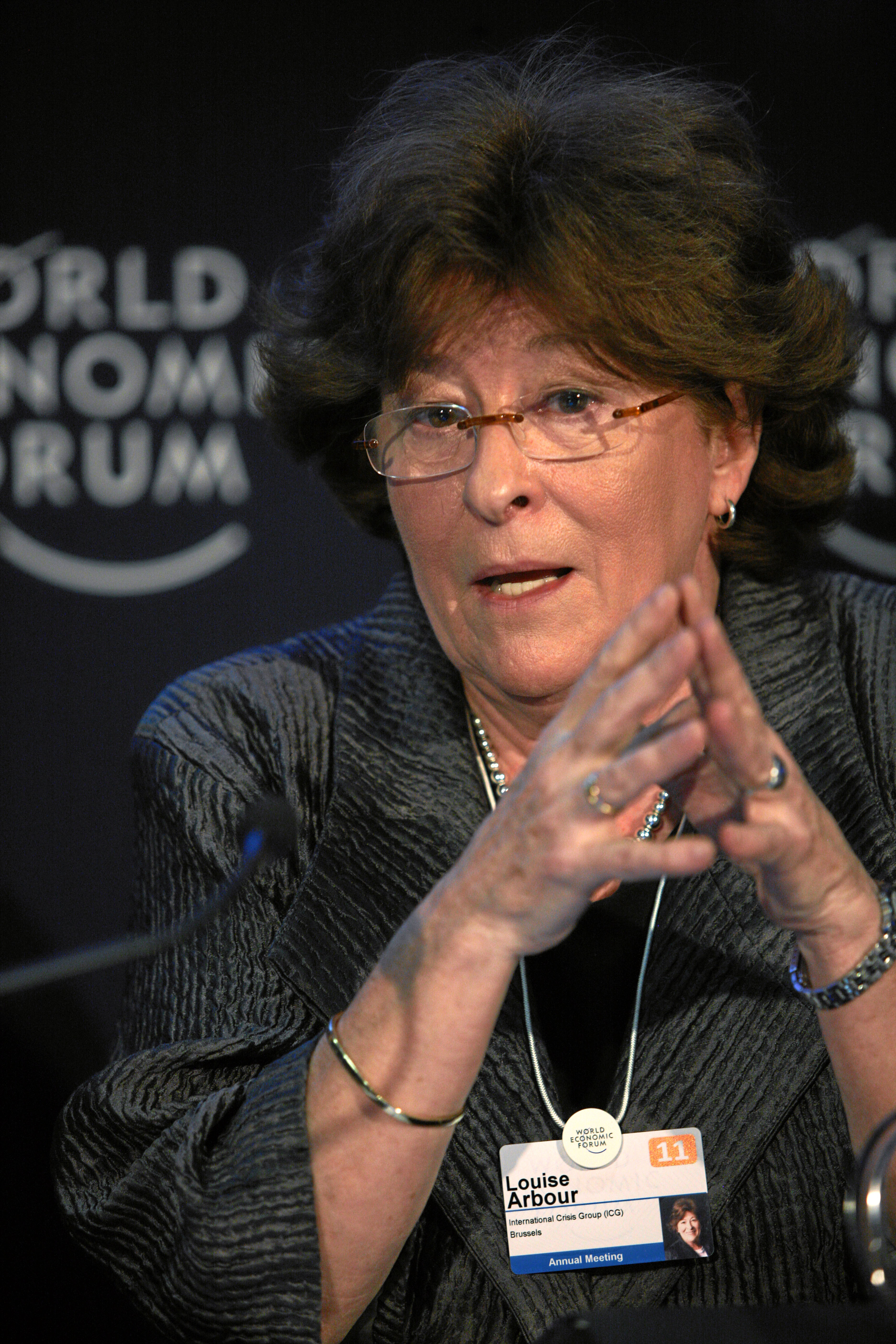
Former Judge of the Supreme Court of Canada the Honourable Louise Arbour, CC, GOQ, honoured with the Colombian Grand Cross of the National Order of Merit.

- The Honourable Louise Arbour

=== From Her Majesty The Queen of Denmark ===
==== Knight First Class of the Order of the Dannebrog ====
- Mr. John B. Petersen

=== From the President of French Republic ===
==== National Order of the Legion of Honour ====
===== Commander =====
- Mr. Claude Laverdure

===== Officer =====
- The Honourable Serge Joyal

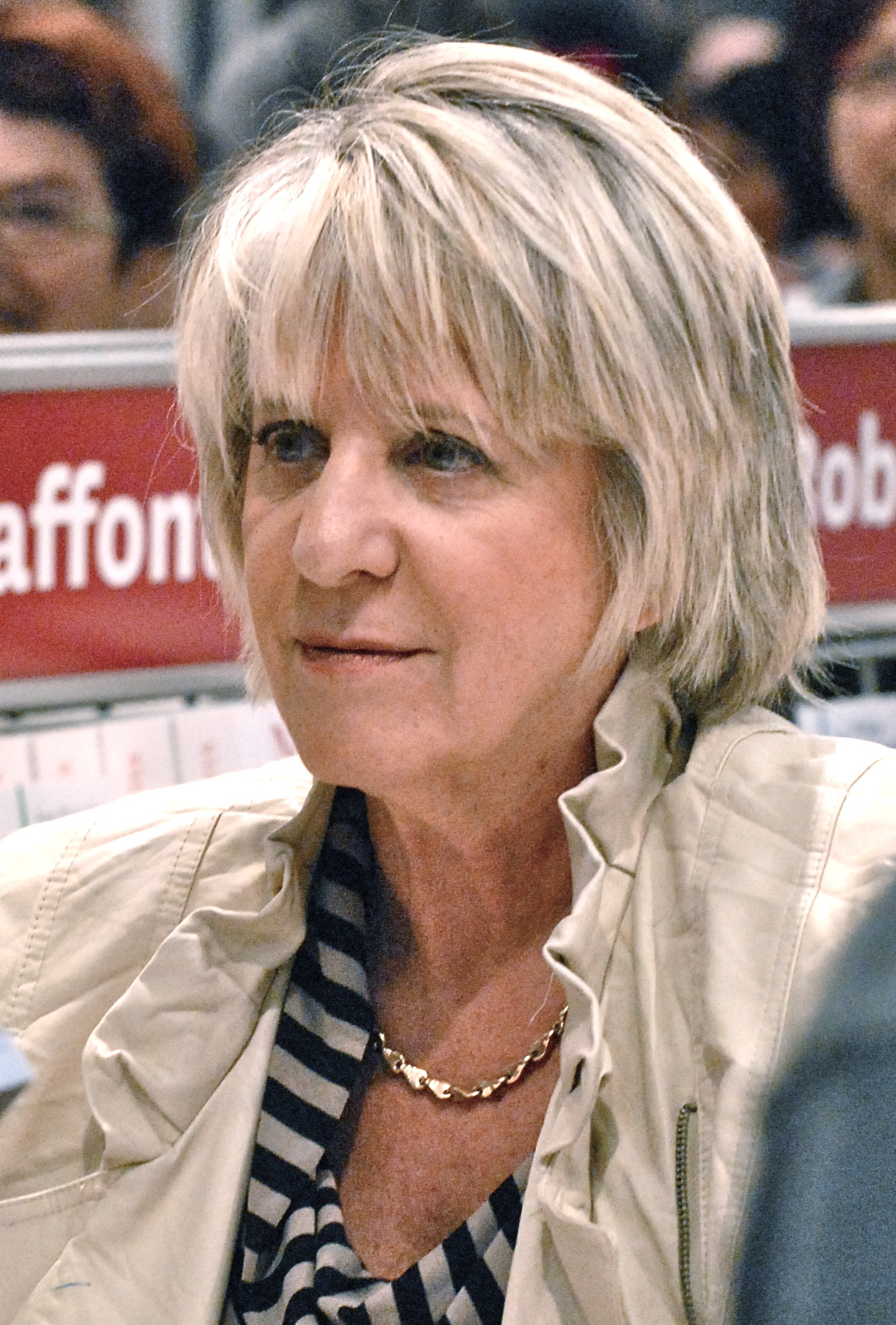
Denise Bombardier honoured with the insignia of an officer of the National Order of the Legion of Honour.

- Mrs. Denise Bombardier

===== Knight =====
- Professor Mark A. Wainberg

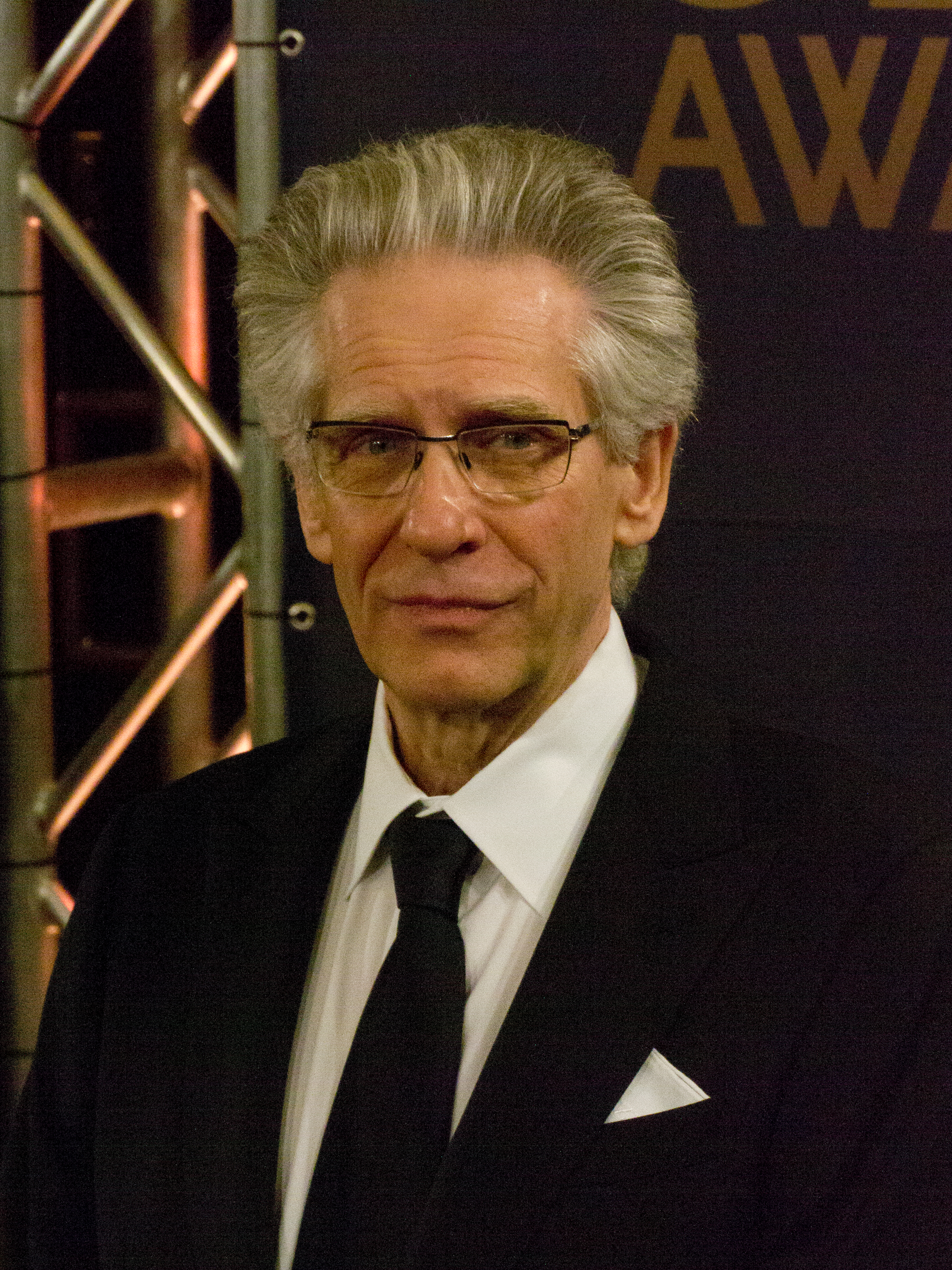
Canadian filmmaker David Cronenberg, CC, O.Ont., honoured with France's insignia of a Knight of the National Order of the Legion of Honour.

- Mr. David Cronenberg

==== National Order of Merit ====
===== Knight =====
- Mrs. Louise Baron
- Mr. Daniel Muzyka
- Mrs. Mona Nemer

==== Order of the Academic Palms ====
===== Commander =====
- Mr. Marcel Masse

===== Officer =====
- Mr. Bruno-Marie Bechard
- Mr. Pierre Lapointe
- Mr. Pierre Moreau
- Mr. Luc Vinet

===== Knight =====
- Mrs. Renée Pelland-Legendre
- Mrs. Munirah Amra Lakhi
- Mrs. Claire Bergeron Boivin
- Mrs. Margot Bolduc
- Mrs. Murielle Comeau
- Mr. Robert Cormier
- Mr. Jacques Couturier
- Mrs. Martha Crago Borgmann
- Mrs. Nedialka Gorinov Stefanova
- Mrs. Kathryn Hamer

==== National Defence Medals ====
===== National Defence Medal, Gold Echelon with Clasp « Gendarmerie nationale » =====
- Captain José Bernard
- Sergeant Jean Gagnon

===== National Defence Medal, Gold Echelon =====
- Brigadier-General Richard Blanchette

===== National Defence Medal, Silver Echelon, with Clasps « Bâtiments de combat » and « Missions d'assistance extérieure » =====
- Lieutenant(N) Jonathan Simard-Mercier

===== National Defence Medal, Bronze Echelon with Clasps Gendarmerie nationale =====
- Corporal Neil James Wentzell

===== National Defence Medal, Bronze Echelon with Clasps Land Force =====
- Master Sergeant Benoit Bergeron

==== Overseas Medal with "Lebanon" Clasp ====
- Lieutenant(N) Jonathan Simard-Mercier

==== French Commemorative Medal with Clasp ex-Yugoslavia ====
- Major Doris Gobeil

=== From the President of Hungary ===
==== Commander's Cross of the Order of Merit ====
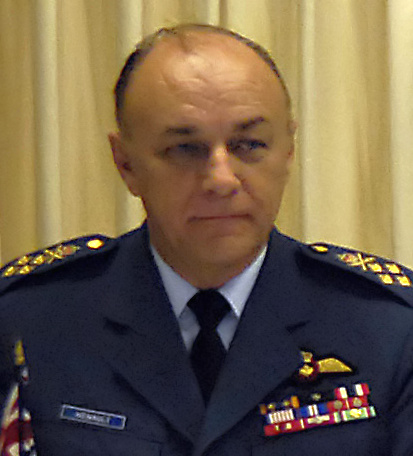
Former Chief of Defence Staff General Raymond Henault, honoured with the Commander's Cross of the Order of Merit of Hungary

- General Raymond Henault, C.M.M., M.S.C., C.D.

==== Knight's Cross of the Order of Merit (Civil Division) ====
- Mr. Pat Cortina

=== From the President of Italy ===
==== Order of the Star of Solidarity ====
===== Commander =====
- Mr. Orazio Pillitteri
- Mr. James Di Luca
- Mr. Marc Muzzo
- Mr. Gregory Sorbara

===== Knight =====
- Mr. Umberto Manca Berretta
- Mr. Antonio Falcone
- Mr. Bruno Giammaria
- Mr. Ermanno La Riccia
- Mr. Guelfo Regalino
- Mr. Luigi Ripandelli
- Mr. Angelo Sartor
- Ms. Anna Maria Zampieri Pan

==== Order of Merit of the Italian Republic ====
===== Commander of the Order of Merit =====
- Mr. Luigi Mion

===== Knight of the Order of Merit =====
- Mr. Tarquinio Colavecchio
- Mr. Luciano Gonella
- Mr. Vincenzo Scida
- Mr. Albert De Luca
- Mr. Angelo Persichilli
- Mr. Tarquinio Colavecchio
- Mr. Giuseppe Nicastro
- Mr. Antonio Porretta

=== From His Majesty The Emperor of Japan ===
==== Order of the Rising Sun, Gold Rays with Neck Ribbon ====
- Mr. John Mark Powles
- Mr. Chow Yei Ching
- Dr. Joseph F. Kess
- Dr William Norrie

==== Order of the Rising Sun, Gold and Silver Rays ====
- Mr. Cy Hisao Saimoto
- Mr. Frankie P. Wu

==== Order of the Rising Sun, Gold Rays with Rosette ====
- Father Gabriel Boudreault

=== From the President of Kenya ===
==== Medal of Elder of the Order of the Burning Spear ====
- Mr. Inderjeet Singh Bhoi

=== From the President of the Republic of Korea ===
==== Korea Service Medal ====
- Mr. Peter Seiersen

=== From the President of Latvia ===
==== Three Stars Order ====
- Dr. Vilis Mileiko
- Mr. Janis Briedis

==== Cross of Recognition ====
- Mr. Andris Kesteris

=== From the President of Lithuania ===
==== Order of Merit ====
===== Commander's Cross =====
- Mr. Pranas Gaida-Gaidamavicius

==== Knight's Cross ====
- Mr. Arunas Staskevicius

=== From the Government of Mali ===
==== Knight of the National Order ====
- Major Luc A. Racine (posthumous)

=== From the President of the United Mexican States ===
==== Band of the Mexican Order of the Aztec Eagle ====
- Mr. Gaëtan Lavertu

=== From Her Majesty The Queen of the Netherlands ===
==== Order of Orange-Nassau ====
===== Knight of the Order of Orange-Nassau =====
- Dr. Angus Bruneau

===== Member of the Order of Orange-Nassau =====
- Ms. Ruth Simpson

=== From the President of Nigeria ===
==== Knight of the Order of Merit ====
- Mr. Pierre Thomas
- Mr. Raynald Cloutier
- Mr. Jim Schneider

=== From the Secretary General of the North Atlantic Treaty Organisation ===
==== Meritorious Service Medal ====
- Mr. Aaron Boon
- Corporal Jerret Dickinson
- Brigadier-General Richard Blanchette
- Lieutenant-Colonel Réjean Duchesneau

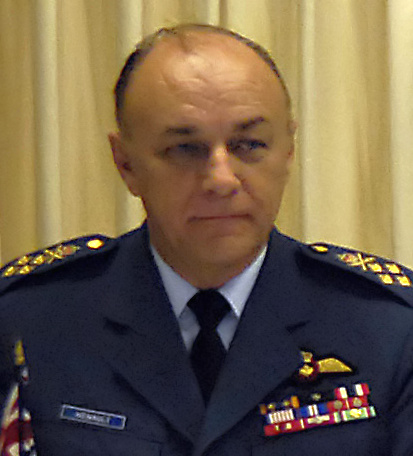
Former Chief of Defence Staff General Raymond Henault, honoured with NATO's Meritorious Service Medal

- General Raymond Henault
- Colonel Greg Loos
- Colonel Jim McNaughton
- Commander Stuart Moors
- Mr. Kyle Pizzey
- Lieutenant-Colonel Thomas Ross

=== From His Majesty The King of Norway ===
==== Norwegian Participation Medal ====
- Mr. Leif Berget

=== From the President of Poland ===
==== Commander's Cross of the Order of Merit ====
- Mr. Leszek Missala

==== Golden Cross of the Order of Merit ====
- Mrs. Ewa Barycka
- Mrs. Krystyna Budniak
- Mr. David Stephen Cassivi
- Mrs. Stefania Dulemba
- Mrs. Zofia Kata
- Mr. Frank Simpson
- Mrs. Elzbieta Szczepanska

==== Knight's Cross of the Order of Merit ====
- Mrs. Wanda Bujalska
- Mr. Piotr Jassem
- Mrs. Jadwiga Sztrumf
- Mr. Czeslaw Borek
- Mr. Franciszek Garason
- Mr. Jan Jablonski
- Mr. Antoni Jedlinski
- Mrs. Maria Helena Kiczma
- Mr. Boguslaw Stanislaw Mosielski (posthumously)
- Mr. Mieczyslaw Slomiany
- Mrs. Shirley Mask Connolly
- Mr. David Shulist
- Mr. Kazimierz Tarnowski (posthumously)
- Reverend Aloysius Rekowski (posthumously)

==== Officer's Cross of the Order of Polonia Restituta ====
- Mr. Marek Redka
- Mr. Wladyslaw Marcin Kluszczyński
- Mr. Edward Whitley (posthumously)

==== Knight's Cross of the Order of Polonia Restitua ====
- Ms. Stanislawa (Sister Margaret) Górska

=== From the President of Russia ===
==== Order of Friendship ====
- Dr. Piotr Dutkiewicz

=== From His Majesty The King of Spain ===
==== Order of Civil Merit ====
===== Great Cross =====
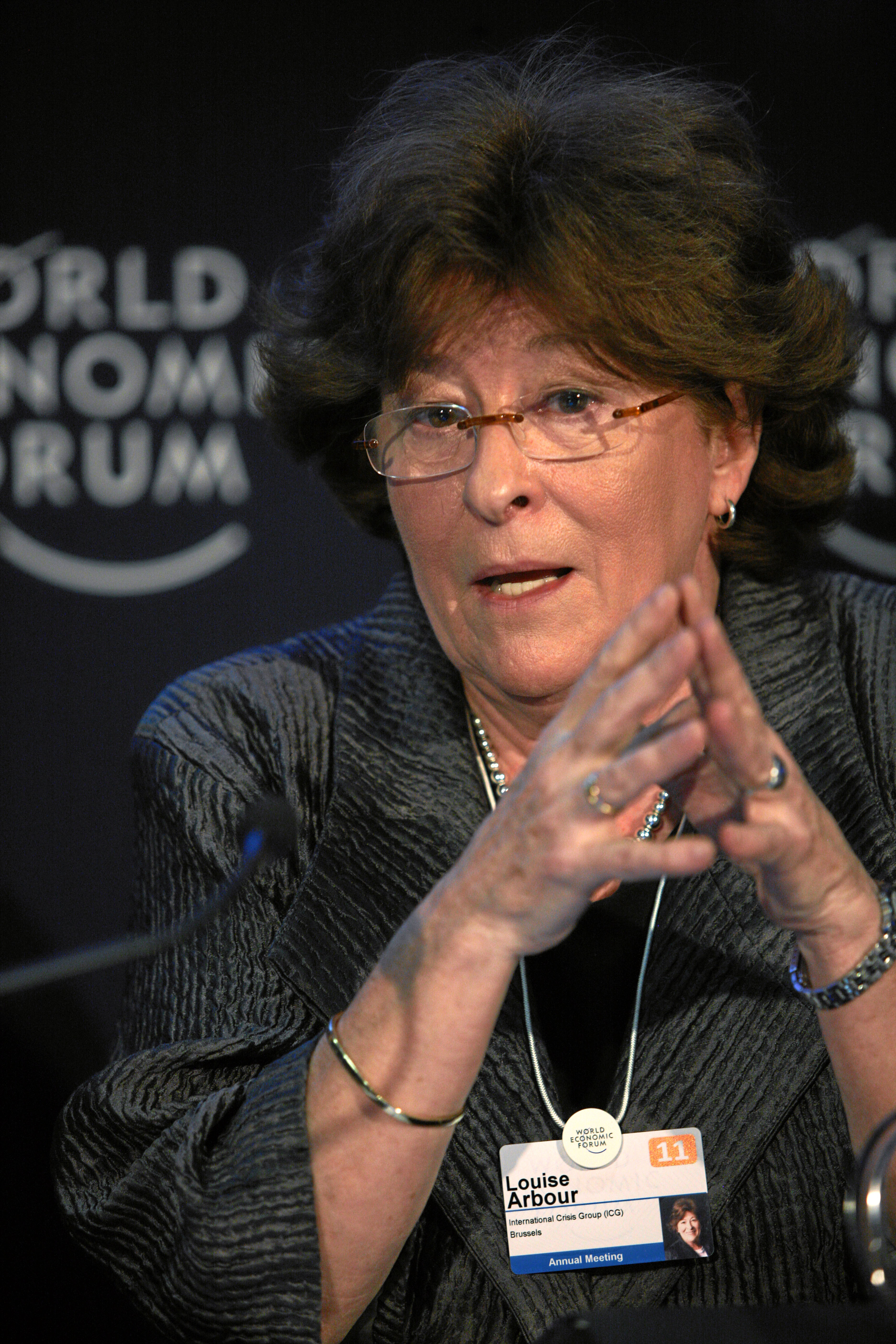
Former Judge of the Supreme Court of Canada the Honourable Louise Arbour, CC, GOQ, honoured by Spain's insignia of the Great Cross of the Order of Civil Merit.

- The Honourable Louise Arbour

===== Commander =====
- Mr. Jean-Pierre Andrieux

===== Officer =====
- Ms. Barbara Cappuccitti
- Mr. Gerry Shikatani
- Staff Sergeant Denis Amyot

=== From His Majesty The King of Sweden ===
==== Commander of the Royal Order of the Polar Star ====
- The Honourable Paule Gauthier
- Mr. Ron Shirkey

=== From the President of Ukraine ===
==== Order of Merit, 3rd Class ====
- Ms. Lisa Shymko
- Dr. Zenon Kohut
- Dr. Volodymyr Mezentsev
- Dr. Yarema Kelebay
- Mr. Yurij Luhovy
- Mr. Peter Savaryn
- Dr. Roman Serbyn
- Mrs. Irene Sushko
- Mr. Radomir Bilash
- Mr. Stephan Horlatsch
- Ms. Daria Luciw
- Ms. Iryna Mycak
- Mr. Taras Hukalo
- Dr. Ehor W. Gauk
- Mr. Ostap Hawaleshka
- Mr. Leo Ledohowski

==== Order of Princess Olha, 3rd Class ====
- Mrs. Halyna Horun Levytsky

==== Medal for Noble Work and Virtue ====
- Mr. Bohdan Babiak
- Mrs. Slavka Shulakewych
- Mr. Eugene Krenosky
- Ms. Lesia Szwaluk
- Mr. Orest Warnyca
- Mr. Ivan Serbyn
- Ms. Margareta Shpir

=== From the President of the United States of America ===
==== Legion of Merit ====
===== Officer =====
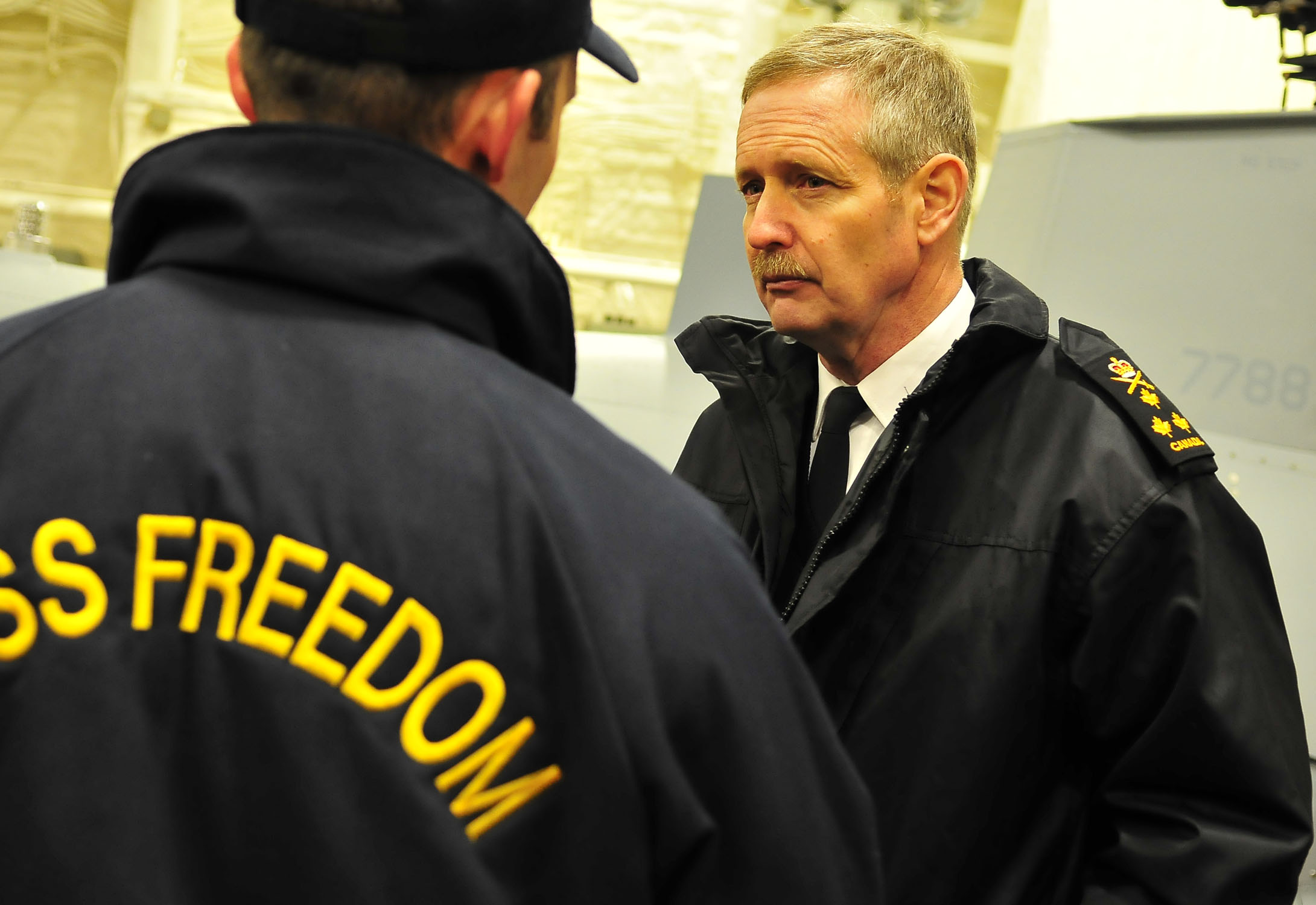
Former Chief of Maritime Staff Vice-Admiral Drew W. Robertson, honoured with the United States Legion of Merit.

- Vice-Admiral Drew W. Robertson
- Brigadier-General Gregory A. Young

===== Legionnaire =====
- Captain(N) Leslie J. Falloon

==== Bronze Star Medal with Oak Leaf Cluster ====
- Lieutenant-Colonel Darryl A. Mills

==== Bronze Star Medal ====
- Colonel Gary R. Stafford
- Captain James A. H. Chorley
- Chief Warrant Officer David W. Preeper
- Lieutenant-Colonel Darryl A. Mills
- Major Jay A. MacKeen

==== Meritorious Service Medal, First Oak Leaf Cluster ====
- Major Timothy W. Levatte

==== Meritorious Service Medal ====
- Chief Warrant Officer Kirby V. Burgess
- Master Warrant Officer Andrew F. Choquette
- Colonel Douglas A. MacLean
- Colonel Guy J. Maillet
- Major Patrice Paquin
- Major Paul G. Young
- Major Travis W. Brassington
- Lieutenant-Colonel Michel Heroux
- Major Robert B. Passant
- Lieutenant-Colonel Joseph R. Poulin
- Major Vincent Peter Wawryk
- Lieutenant-Colonel Wayne R. Krause
- Lieutenant-Colonel Darryl A. Mills
- Major Jason W. Stark

==== Air Medal ====
- Major Scott A. Hoffman
- Captain Reid I. Johnson
- Sergeant Danny R. Reid

== Erratums of Commonwealth and Foreign Orders, Decorations and Medal awarded to Canadians ==
=== Corrected on 31 January 2009 ===
- Major-General Peter J. Devlin received the Legion of Merit from the President of the United States of America.

=== Corrected on 26 September 2009 ===
- Lieutenant-Colonel Wayne R. Krause received the Meritorious Service Medal from the President of the United States of America.

=== Corrected on 26 December 2009 ===
- Patrick Riley received the Knight of the Order of May from the President of Argentina.
