= André Desrochers =

Canadian ornithologist and ecologist

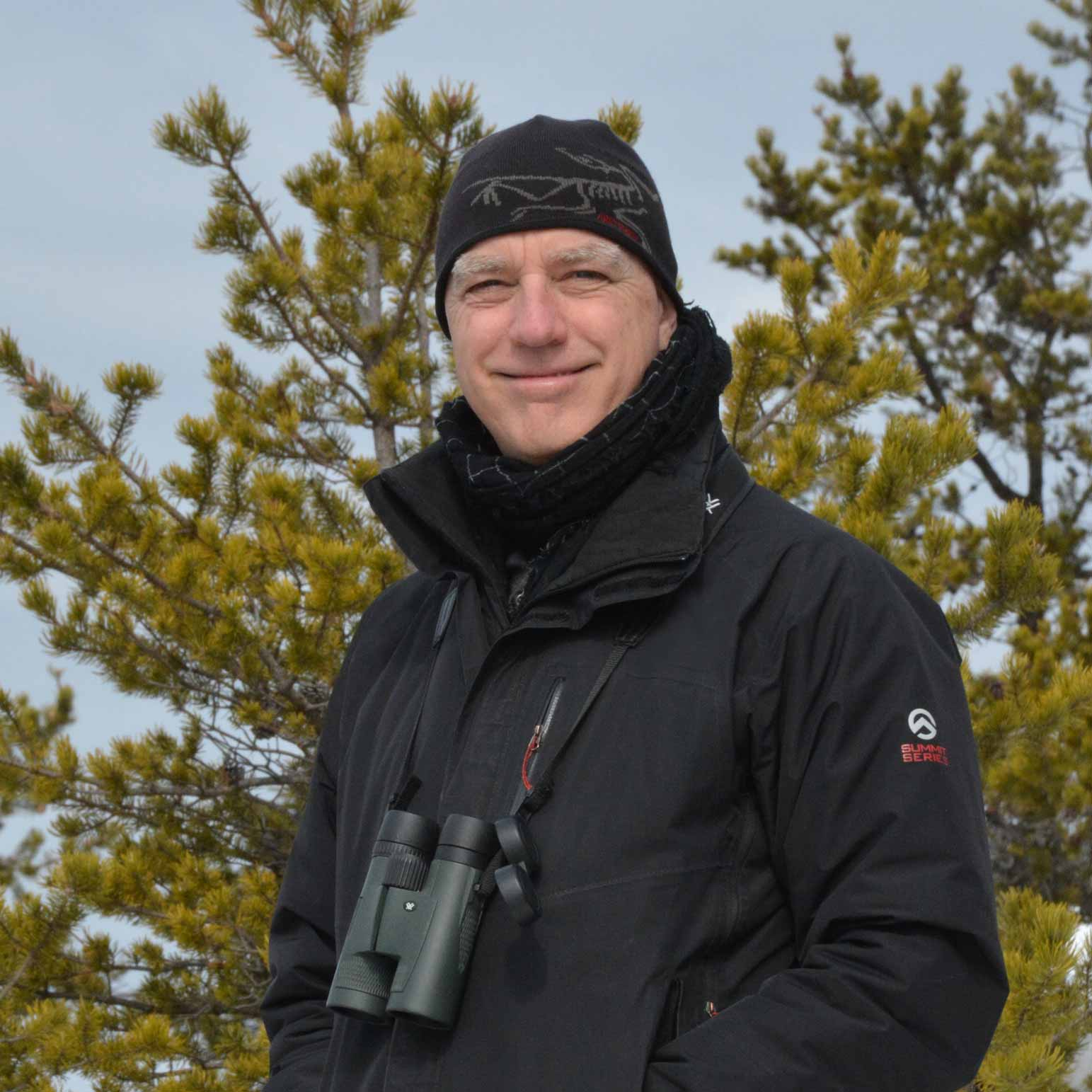
- Born: 1961
- Alma mater: Université Laval; University of Alberta; University of Cambridge
- Employer: Université Laval
- Website: toq.ffgg.ulaval.ca/wp/blog/author/toqffggulaval/

André Desrochers is a Quebec scientist with expertise in ornithology and ecology.

As of 2015, he has worked for almost thirty years in these research areas. Since the mid-1990s, he also worked to promote environmental conservation through various organizations.

== Academic background ==
After studies in biology at Laval University, Quebec and in zoology at the University of Alberta in Canada, he obtained a doctorate in zoology at the University of Cambridge in the UK. After three post-doctoral internships – in zoology at the University of Cambridge for the first (1991), the other two at Laval University, including one in the biology department (1992–1993) and the other in the plant sciences department (1993–1994) – he was a visiting scholar at the department of ecology and systematic of the University of Helsinki, Finland (2001–2002) and at the Cornell Lab of Ornithology in the United States (2008–2009). He is a fellow of the American Ornithologists' Union.

== Professional activities ==
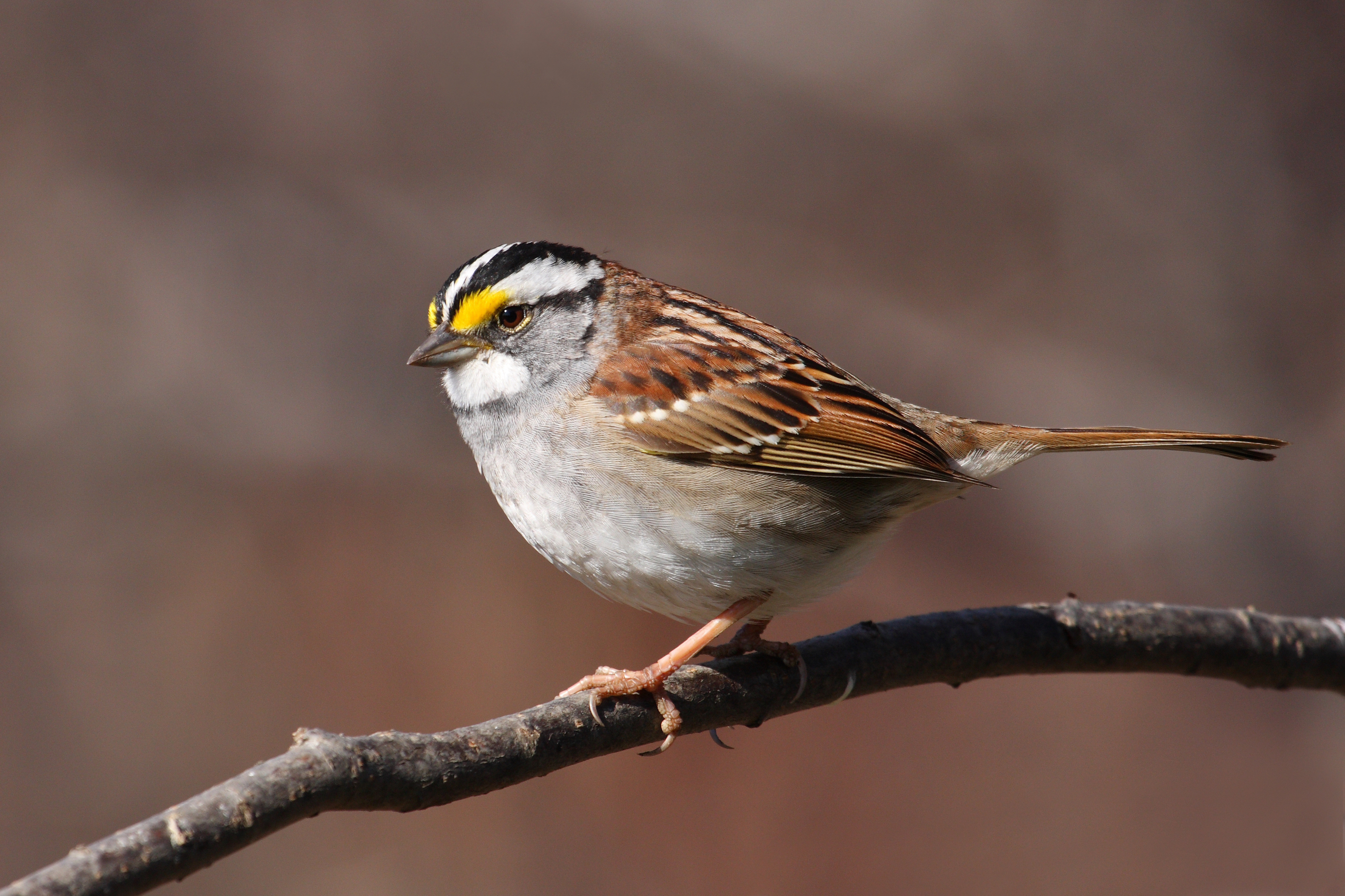
White-throated sparrow (Zonotrichia albicollis), one of the species studied by André Desrochers

His work focuses primarily on impacts of forestry practices on the behavior, ecology and rapid evolution of birds and mammals. Statistical modeling is a recurring theme in his work.

His areas of expertise are:

- urban planning;
- spatial analysis;
- animal ecology (birds, mammals);
- forestry and wildlife;
- landscape ecology;
- protection of species of fauna and flora

Specifically, his works are grouped into three sub-disciplines of ecology:

- habitat fragmentation;
- winter landscape ecology;
- peatland bird ecology

He has published over 120 scientific articles and reports which have been cited over 4000 times in the scientific literature. Regarding books, he participated in the drafting of fifteen books, alone or in collaboration with other authors. Besides this research, he also serves on the technical committee of the Boreal Avian Modelling Project (BAM), an international research project. He currently teaches at Laval University Québec, and is director of graduate studies in forestry. Since 2000, he has devoted most of his work at the Forêt Montmorency, Université Laval research and teaching forest, the largest one of its kind in the World.

In 2004, he organized the largest annual scientific meeting of bird scientists in North America, the American Ornithologists' Union Meeting. This congress was under the auspices of Laval University and united for the occasion the Society of Canadian Ornithologists to its American counterpart.

He is also member of the following research groups:

- Centre for Forest Research (CEF-ULAVAL);
- Industrial Research Chair of the Natural Sciences and Engineering Research Council (NSERC) in Peatland;
- Peatland Ecology Research Group (PERG)

From 2003 to 2006, he led the " Centre de recherche en biologie forestière " (Research Center in Forest Biology) (CRBF). Founded in 1985, the CRBF merged in 2006 with the "Groupe de Recherche en Écologie Forestière interuniversitaire" (Interuniversity Research Group for Forest Ecology) (GREFi) to form the "Centre d'études de la forêt" (Centre for Forest Research) which is composed of some 60 researchers in 11 universities of Quebec.

He has been member of the scientific council of Bird Studies Canada (1997–1999), the board of the Society of Canadian Ornithologists (1997–2001) and the North American board of governors of the Society for Conservation Biology (2001–2004).

== Species studied ==
The bird species he studied include the Eurasian blackbird, snow goose, black-capped chickadee, boreal chickadee, alpine accentor, white-throated sparrow, Bicknell's thrush, ovenbird, pileated woodpecker. In mammals, his research has focused particularly on the American marten and the Siberian flying squirrel.

== Bibliography ==
For a more complete overview: Centre for Forest Research

=== Books ===
- André Desrochers, Repenser la conservation de l’environnement, Québec, Presses de l'Université Laval, 2022, 268 p.

==== Book chapters ====
- Rochefort, L., Desrochers, A., Graf, M., Lavoie, C., Poulin, M., Price, J., Strack, M. et Waddington, M. (2011) Northern peatlands. (chap. 9) In Wetland Habitats of North America: Ecology and Conservation Concerns. (Batzer, D.P. et Baldwin, A.H., Eds.) Berkeley, CA, États-Unis, University of California Press
- Desrochers, A. (2009) Aménagement des habitats de la faune. (Chap. 18) In Manuel de foresterie, 2e éd. (Ordre des ingénieurs forestiers du Québec, Éds.) Québec, Éditions MultiMondes, p. 771-798
- Desrochers, A. et Belisle, M. (2007) Edge, patch and landscape effects on chickadee movements. (Chap. 15) In Ecology and Behavior of Chickadees and Titmice: an integrated approach. (Otter, K.A., Eds.) New York, US, Oxford University Press, pages 243-261
- Desrochers, A., Otter, K.A., Belisle, M. et Olson, J.R. (2007) Landscape ecology, behavior, and conservation issues. (Chap. Synopsis IV) In Ecology and Behavior of Chickadees and Titmice: an integrated approach. (Otter, K.A., Eds.) New York, US, Oxford University Press, pages 293-298
- Desrochers, A. et van Duinen, G.A. (2006) Peatland fauna. (Chap. 5) In Boreal Peatland Ecosystems. (Wieder, R.K. et Vitt, D.H., Éds.) Berlin, Germany, Springer-Verlag, pages 67–100
- Desrochers, A. (2003) Bridging the gap: Linking individual bird movement and territory establishment rules with patterns of distribution in fragmented forests. (chap. 5) In Animal Behavior and Wildlife Conservation. (Festa-Bianchet, M. et Apollonio, M., Eds.) Washington, DC, US, Island Press, pages 63–76
- Desrochers, A. (2001) Les oiseaux: diversité et répartition. (Chap. 6) In Écologie des tourbières du Québec-Labrador (Payette, S. et Rochefort, L., Éds.) Québec, Canada, Les Presses de l'université Laval, pages 159-173
- Desrochers, A. et Huot, J. (1996) Conséquences des mesures actuelles relatives à la conservation de la faune forestière au Québec. In L'utilisation durable des forêts québécoises: de l'exploitation à la protection. (Cantin, D. et Potvin, C., Eds.) Québec, Canada, Les Presses de l'université Laval, pages 145-153
- Desrochers, A. et Magrath, R.D. (1996) Divorce in the European Blackbird: seeking greener pastures? (Chap. 9) In Partnerships in birds: The study of monogamy. (Black, J.M., Eds.) New York, US, Oxford University Press, pages 177-191
- Desrochers, A., Haddad, S., Savard, J.-P.L. et Calme, S. (1996) Impact de l'exploitation des tourbières sur l'avifaune. In La restauration des tourbières exploitées: le développement d'une stratégie intégrée au Québec. (Rochefort, L. et Quinty, F., Eds.) Sainte-Foy, Québec, Canada, université Laval, pages 37–51
- Desrochers, A., Calme, S., Savard, J.-P.L. et Haddad, S. (1996) Les patrons de distribution des oiseaux des tourbières du Québec méridional. In La restauration des tourbières exploitées: le développement d'une stratégie intégrée au Québec. (Rochefort, L. et Quinty, F., Éds.) Sainte-Foy, Québec, Canada, université Laval, pages 51–55
- Haddad, S. et Desrochers, A. (1995) Impact de l'exploitation des tourbières sur l'avifaune des sites naturels avoisinants. In La restauration des tourbières exploitées: le développement d'une stratégie intégrée au Québec. (Rochefort, L. et Quinty, F., Eds.) Sainte-Foy, QC, Canada, université Laval, pages 19–23
- Calme, S. et Desrochers, A. (1995) Les patrons de distribution des oiseaux des tourbières du Québec méridional. In La restauration des tourbières exploitées: le développement d'une stratégie intégrée au Québec. (Rochefort, L. et Quinty, F., Eds.) Québec, Canada, université Laval, pages 23–27
- Desrochers, A. (1995) Mésange à tête brune. In Les oiseaux nicheurs du Québec: Atlas des oiseaux nicheurs du Québec méridional. (Gauthier, J. et Aubry, Y., Éds.) Montréal, Canada, Association québécoise des groupes d'ornithologues, Société québécoise de protection des oiseaux, Service canadien de la faune, Environnement Canada, pages 738-739
- Desrochers, A. (1995) Mésange à tête noire. In Les oiseaux nicheurs du Québec: Atlas des oiseaux nicheurs du Québec méridional. (Gauthier, J. et Aubry, Y., Éds.) Montréal, Canada, Association québécoise des groupes d'ornithologues, Société québécoise de protection des oiseaux, Service canadien de la faune, Environnement Canada, pages 734-737
- Desrochers, A. et Brodeur, J. (1994) Impact des variations naturelles et artificielles des caractéristiques de tourbières sur les populations d'oiseaux et d'arthropodes. In La restauration des tourbières exploitées: le développement d'une stratégie intégrée au Québec. (Rochefort, L. et Quinty, F., Eds.) Sainte-Foy, Québec, Canada, université Laval, pages 15–34

=== Articles published in proceedings ===
- Falardeau, G., Savard, J.-P.L. et Desrochers, A. (2000) Strip-cutting: nest success and bird response to strip regrowth. In Ecology and conservation of forest birds. Fredericton, N.B., Canada. (Diamond, A. W. et Nettleship, D. N., Eds.) Society of Canadian Ornithologists, pages 115-125
- Desrochers, A., Lavoie, C., Pellerin, S. et Poulin, M. (2000) Bog conservation: a Canadian perspective. In 11th International Peat Congress. Québec, QC, Canada. (Rochefort, L. et Daigle, J. -Y., Eds.) International Peat Society, p. 1027-1033
- Lavoie, C. et Desrochers, A. (2000) Scientific tools for peatland conservation. In 11th International Peat Congress. Québec, QC, Canada
- Desrochers, A., Hannon, S.J., Belisle, M. et St. Clair, C.C. (1999) Movement of songbirds in fragmented forests: Can we "scale up" from behaviour to explain occupancy patterns in the landscape? In Proceedings of the 22nd International Ornithological Congress, Durban. Johannesburg. (Adams, N. J. et Slotow, R. H., Eds.) BirdLife South Africa, pages 2447-2464
- Savard, J.-P.L. et Desrochers, A. (1997) Diversité faunique dans les tourbières du Québec méridional. In Compte rendu du onzième atelier sur la petite faune. Duchesnay, QC, Canada. (Desrosiers, A., Eds.) Gouvernement du Québec, ministère de l'environnement et de la faune, pages 82–92
- Desrochers, A. (1996) Action locale, pensée globale et biodiversité. In L'Être humain, l'animal et l'environnement: dimensions éthiques et juridiques. Montréal, Québec, Canada. (Leroux, T. et Létourneau, L., Éds.) Éditions Thémis, pages 431-437
- Desrochers, A. (1996) Placer les milieux humides dans un contexte écologique régional : le cas des tourbières. In États généraux du paysage. Québec, QC, Canada. (Anonyme, Eds.) Association de corps professionnels québécois, p. 64

== Other activities ==
For several years (2013–2020), he has been vice-president of the Regroupement QuébecOiseaux and a member of its board of directors, an NGO formerly known as "Quebec Association of ornithologists groups", whose aim is to "promote the study of birds and ensure their protection and their habitats" while allowing people to enjoy the field of ornithology in Quebec. He is also responsible for the EPOQ-eBird committee.

In the 1990s, he was a member of a group of about ten volunteers who gave birth to the "Fondation pour la protection du patrimoine naturel" for the Quebec City region. One of the main achievements was the creation of the Parc des Hauts-Fonds in Saint-Augustin-de-Desmaures.

For the past five years (2015–2020), he has been responsible for the Christmas Bird Census in Quebec City. This activity is part of the Christmas Bird Count of the Audubon Society, an old institution over 100 years, sponsored in Canada by Bird Studies Canada. He is a member of the "Club des ornithologues de Québec" since 1978.

In May 2019, he created the Tendances Ornithologiques du Québec website, which went online the following month. For each season, the site presents a summary of bird species observed in each region of Quebec from various amateur ornithologists' clubs.

In addition to presenting lectures from time to time, André Desrochers continues to inform the public of his observations of Quebec ornithology through his opinions and analyses by keeping a blog on the eBird Québec portal.

=== Militancy ===
Environmental activist, André Desrochers has served for the Union Québécoise pour la Conservation de la nature (now Nature Québec). He was vice-president of the latter organization from 1993 to 1997, and interim president in 1993. He has also presided Stratégies Saint-Laurent in 1993–1994. He has served on a Task Force for Canada's former Environment Minister Sheila Copps, to help develop what is now Canada's Species At Risk Act (SARA). In the blogosphere, Desrochers is known for his non-consensual writings. Formerly alarmed by global warming, he has lately become a vocal "lukewarmer", making accusations of attempting to thwart debate on the causes of climate change and the associated policy consequences.

A self-described humanist, Desrochers says he actively promotes the use of the scientific method and contests the "alarmism" and misanthropy in current environmentalist discourse.

== See also ==
- Landscape ecology
- Habitat fragmentation
- Silviculture
- Bird conservation
