= BPQ =

BPQ or bpq may refer to:

- Bird Protection Quebec, the oldest organization of birders in Quebec
- BPQ, the Indian Railways station code for Balharshah Junction railway station, Maharashtra, India
- bpq, the ISO 639-3 code for Bandanese Malay, Banda Islands, Indonesia
