= Rocky McKeon =

American singer

- Born: Rocky McKeon
- Origin: Robinson Canal, Louisiana
- Website: http://islederniere.com/

Rocky McKeon is a musician and a fluent speaker of Louisiana French. He is regularly sought after for his knowledge of French as it is spoken in Terrebonne and Lafourche Parishes. He is an ardent defender and promoter of Louisiana French, stressing the importance of its use in today's modern times so that it will not die out. With regards to his work for the preservation of French in Louisiana, he was featured in the video for the State of Louisiana's bid for the 2014 Acadian World Congress. Then he was recently acknowledged in the newest Dictionary of Louisiana French as being a "keen word detective" for his aid in the creation of the dictionary. He also provided the translation for the book heartoffact by Karin Eberhardt, into French. In addition, he has assisted in many research projects at Tulane University, and has been featured in several francophone magazines.

In April 2009 he was awarded Le Prix de la Création of 2008 for his poem entry "L'argent a peur" on MondesFrancophones.com.

For the French 421 course at Centenary College in Louisiana for the Spring 2010 semester, he was studied as one of several Louisiana musicians

His band Isle Dernière was featured on the program "LA Music" on LCN-TV, the Louisiana Connection Network. He has performed shows in south Louisiana and in eastern Canada; most notably for the first-anniversary celebration of Le Centre de la Francophonie des Amériques in 2009.

In August 2010, following the 2010 Haiti earthquake and the Deepwater Horizon oil spill, singer/songwriter and poet, Zachary Richard released an album featuring a hip-hop version of Rocky McKeon's song "Le grand gosier," with verses by Samian in French and Emrical in Haitian Creole. The chorus was performed by Zachary Richard, Rocky McKeon and a slew of well-known Canadian francophone artists, notably Bobby Bazini, Daniel Lavoie, Marc Hervieux, Richard Séguin and Luc de Larochellière. The album also includes a version of "Le grand gosier" with verses solely in Algonquin, and another version with verses solely in Haitian Creole.

A music video and a "Making of" video was also produced for "Le grand gosier," featuring the artists performing the song at MIXart Studios in Montréal, Canada, interspersed with footage of pelicans covered in oil along the Louisiana coast. The "Making of" video includes notable artists offering their opinions about the Deepwater Horizon oil spill and about their desire to help.

In 2011, Rocky McKeon's band, Isle Dernière, released a cover of Black Sabbath's "Iron Man" entitled "L'homme en fer" with lyrics sung in Louisiana French on the compilation album En Français: Cajun 'n' Creole Rock 'n' Roll produced by Bayou Teche Brewing and Louis Michot of the Lost Bayou Ramblers. According to Todd Ortego, sales executive and on-air personality at KBON 101.1 FM, "L'homme en fer" is the most-requested song from the album. In 2012, Isle Dernière released "Quand la levée casse," a Louisiana French cover of Led Zeppelin's "When the Levee Breaks" on Bayou Teche Brewing's En Français: Cajun 'n' Creole Rock 'n' Roll Vol. 2, making Isle Dernière the only band to be featured on both CDs.

== See also ==
- Louisiana French
- List of Notable People Related to Louisiana francophone Music
