= Stephen A. Jarislowsky =

Canadian billionaire businessman (1925–2026)

Stephen A. Jarislowsky CC GOQ
- Born: 9 September 1925; Berlin, Brandenburg, Prussia, Germany
- Died: 8 October 2026 (aged 101); Montreal, Quebec, Canada
- Education: Cornell University; University of Chicago; Harvard Business School
- Occupations: Founder, Chairman & CEO of Jarislowsky Fraser Ltd.
- Spouse: Gail Jarislowsky
- Children: 4 (One deceased)

Stephen Arnold Jarislowsky, CC GOQ (9 September 1925 – 8 October 2026) was a Canadian business magnate, investor and philanthropist. He was the founder, chairman and CEO of Jarislowsky Fraser Limited, a Canadian investment management firm with over $40 billion in assets under management.

His personal wealth was estimated at $1.42 billion in December 2017, making him the 34th-richest person in Canada. As of October 2026, his net worth was estimated at $3.8 billion.

== Life and career ==
Jarislowsky was born in Berlin, Germany on 9 September 1925, to Jewish parents, the son of Kaethe (née Gassmann) and Alfred Jarislowsky. When Jarislowsky was aged 4, his father died from scarlet fever, and he and his siblings were sent to live near relatives in Amsterdam. His family later moved to Paris, where Jarislowsky studied and became fluent in French and English. When his stepfather's work, who helped refugees escape German-occupied France for the U.S., was discovered by the Gestapo, his family fled to New York in 1941.

Jarislowsky attended school in North Carolina, and later studied mechanical engineering at Cornell University. He was drafted into the U.S. Army in 1944 and went to occupied Japan in 1945, where he worked in counter-intelligence. Returning to the U.S. in 1946, Jarislowsky earned a master's degree at the University of Chicago and an MBA at Harvard Business School. After graduating from Harvard, he got a job at Alcan Aluminum in Montreal. He briefly returned to the U.S. but later came back to Montreal. In Montreal, Jarislowsky founded Jarislowsky, Fraser & Company Ltd. in 1955. Initially doing business as an investment research boutique, the company later offered investment advice and managed investments for a pension fund during the 1960s.

In 2007, Jarislowsky's firm, which owns 18 percent of the shares of Canfor, was embroiled in a bitter proxy fight with Vancouver-based tycoon Jim Pattison, who owns 25 percent of the company. Pattison won and ousted CEO Jim Shepherd over Canfor's poor performance and declining share price, replacing him for the interim with Jim Pattison.

In several magazine and newspaper articles between 2002 and 2004, Jarislowsky predicted a deep economic recession, which began in 2008 in the United States and spread around the world. On 16 December 2008, in an interview on CBC's The Current, he opined that the current recession would last at least two to five years and may last much longer if corrective measures are not taken by governments and the general public. He further argued that inflation is the only solution in the circumstances to reducing the enormous debt loads held at all levels of society and that massive and immediate government spending is also needed to stimulate the economy.

He was married and had four children, one of whom predeceased him.

Jarislowsky died in Montreal on 8 October 2026, at the age of 101.

== Recognition ==
Jarislowsky was appointed a Member of the Order of Canada (CM) in 1990, promoted to Officer of the Order of Canada (OC) of the same order in 1994, and promoted again to Companion of the Order of Canada (CC) in the 2009 Canadian honours.

He was appointed a Knight of the National Order of Quebec (CQ) in 2002 and promoted to a Grand Officer of the National Order of Quebec (GOQ) in 2007.

He also received the Queen Elizabeth II Golden Jubilee Medal, the Queen Elizabeth II Diamond Jubilee Medal, and the King Charles III Coronation Medal in 2002, 2012 and 2022 respectively.

He was the basis of a recurring character named Stephen Horowitz in several of Louise Penny's Inspector Gamache mystery novels, set in Quebec.

== Criticism and advocacy ==
=== Business ethics ===
Apart from his personal business pursuits, he was a defender of business ethics (and a critic of breaches in ethics). In 2002, together with Claude Lamoureux, he founded the Canadian Coalition for Good Governance to promote strong business ethics.

=== Quebec separatism ===
Jarislowsky was openly against Quebec nationalism. In a 1997 speech to the Westmount Municipal Association, Jarislowsky drew comparisons between Parizeau and Bouchard with the fascism of Franco's Spain and Hitler's Nazi Germany and told how, days after the 1995 referendum, he suggested the partition of Quebec and the transformation of Montreal into a city state. In his speech, he stated that his fellow citizens should oppose the PQ which he said, "feed on the same kind of quasi religious fervor on which all fascists feed (be it the Soviet Union, Nazi Germany or fascist Italy, etc.). A Parizeau, a Bouchard should never be underestimated and, despite lullabies, should never put one to sleep."

=== Boards and charities ===
Jarislowsky was a Director of the C. D. Howe Institute and was also active in numerous other corporations besides his own including SNC-Lavalin, Canfor, Southam, Swiss Bank, and Abitibi. He participated in educational, cultural and charitable activities, and with his wife Gail, endowed numerous eponymous university chairs in Canada.

== Publications ==
- The Investment Zoo (co-written with Craig Toomey), ISBN 2-89472-259-1.
