= Regroupement QuébecOiseaux =

Canadian non-profit organization

The Regroupement QuébecOiseaux Association (formerly the Quebec Association of ornithologists groups) was founded in 1981. This non-profit organization brings together the birdwatchers organizations in Quebec. Its objectives are to "promote the development of bird watching, the study of birds and ensure their protection and their habitats."

== Activities ==
It allows various affiliated organizations to communicate with each other and provides services that can assist those organizations in their activities. It participates in the development of knowledge about the distribution, ecology and bird conservation by the development and maintenance of databases appointed EPOQ since 1988. It distributes information via a website and QuébecOiseaux magazine launched in 1989.

The Regroupement QuébecOiseaux publicly intervene in cases relating to the protection of birds in Quebec including a species at risk monitoring program.

== Board of directors ==
- 2015 - Chairman: Réal Bisson
- 2015 - Vice President: André Desrochers

== See also ==
- eBird
- Bird Protection Quebec
