= Zachary Richard =

American musician and poet

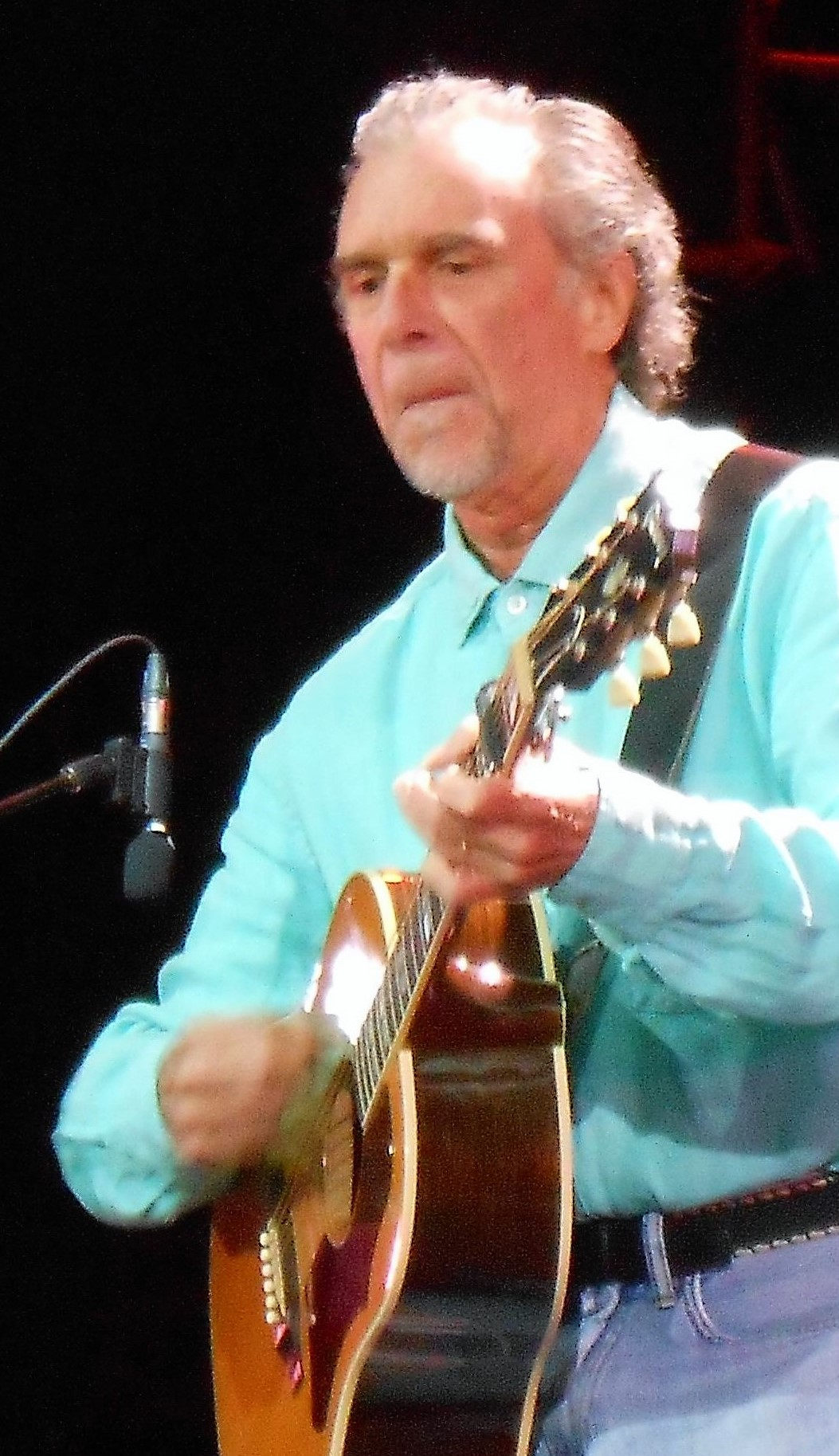
- Zachary Richard performing in Montreal, Quebec, in 2013.

Background information
- Born: Ralph Zachary Richard; September 8, 1950 (age 76); Scott, Louisiana, U.S.
- Origin: Lafayette, Louisiana, U.S.
- Genres: Cajun; Zydeco
- Occupation: Musician
- Instruments: Vocals, accordion, guitar
- Years active: 1972-present
- Label: Kébec Disc
- Website: www.zacharyrichard.com

Ralph Zachary Richard (born September 8, 1950) is an American singer-songwriter and poet. His music is a combination of Cajun and Zydeco musical styles.

== Biography ==
Zachary Richard began his musical career at the age of 8, as soprano in the Bishop's Boys Choir at Saint John's Cathedral in Lafayette, Louisiana. He attended Cathedral High School and Tulane University, graduating summa cum laude in 1972.

Richard has recorded Cajun and zydeco music for over 45 years. He has recorded sixteen studio albums of which five were declared gold albums in Canada with a double platinum (Cap Enragé). Although recording in both English and French, Richard's career has been notably Francophone. He has been awarded 5 Prix Félix (Quebec music award named after Félix Leclerc). He is an Officer in the Ordre des Arts et Lettres de la République Française and a member of the Ordre des Francophones d'Amérique. In 1980, he was awarded the Prix de la Jeune Chanson Française by the French Minister of Culture.

In addition to his musical works, Richard published works include three volumes of poetry and three children's books. Faire Récolte earned the Prix Champlain (Quebec) in 1998 and Feu received the Roland Gasparic Award (Bucharest, Romania) in 2002.

Richard has collaborated on several television documentary projects including Against the Tide, the Story of the Cajun people of Louisiana (producer and music director) which received the Best Historical Documentary prize in 2000 awarded by the National Educational Television Association. The French version, Contre vents, contre marées received the Prix Historia the following year. Zachary was narrator and musical director of Migrations, Vu du Large, Coeurs Batailleurs, and most recently Kouchibouguac, l'histoire de Jackie Vautour et des Expropriés.

In 2009, he was made an honorary Member of the Order of Canada "for his contributions as an author, composer, singer and poet, and for his important role in defending and promoting the French language and the "Cadian" and Acadian identity".

In August 2010, following the 2010 Haiti earthquake and the Deepwater Horizon oil spill, Zachary Richard released an album titled Le grand gosier featuring a hip-hop version of "Le grand gosier" by singer-songwriter Rocky McKeon using the original chorus in Louisiana French and adding verses by Samian in French and Emrical in Haitian Creole. The chorus was performed by Zachary Richard, Rocky McKeon and a slew of well-known Canadian francophone artists, notably Bobby Bazini, Daniel Lavoie, Marc Hervieux, Richard Séguin and Luc de Larochellière. The album also includes a version of "Le grand gosier" with verses solely in Algonquin, and another version with verses solely in Haitian Creole.

Richard suffered a stroke on October 17, 2010, leading him to suspend work and appearances for the rest of that year. He has since resumed touring, recording, and writing on his blog.

== Discography ==
- 1972 - High Time (re-released 2000)
- 1976 - Bayou des mystères
- 1977 - Mardi Gras
- 1978 - Migration
- 1979 - Allons danser
- 1980 - Live in Montreal
- 1981 - Vent d'Été
- 1984 - Zack Attack
- 1987 - Looking Back (compilation 2LP)
- 1988 - Zack's Bon Ton
- 1989 - Mardi Gras Mambo
- 1990 - Women in the Room
- 1992 - Snake Bite Love
- 1996 - Cap Enragé
- 1999 - Travailler c'est trop dur (compilation 2CD)
- 2000 - Coeur fidèle
- 2000 - Silver Jubilee: The Best of Zachary Richard (compilation 1CD)
- 2001 - High Time: The Elektra Recordings (previously unreleased 1974 recordings)
- 2007 - Lumière dans le noir
- 2009 - Last Kiss
- 2010 - Le Grand Gosier
- 2012 - Le fou
- 2013 - J'aime la vie
- 2017 - Gombo
- 2022 - Danser Le Ciel

== Published works ==
- 1980 - Voyage de nuit (Les Intouchables, Montreal)
- 1997 - Faire récolte (with audio CD, Perce Neige, Moncton)
- 1999 - Conte Cajun, l'Histoire de Télésphore et 'Tit Edvard (Les Intouchables, Montreal)
- 2001 - Feu (Les Intouchables, Montreal)
- 2007 - Télésphore et 'Tit Edvard dans le Nord (Les Intouchables, Montreal)
- 2023 - Les rafales du carême (Éditions Tintamare, Shreveport, Louisiana)

== Major distinctions ==
- 1978 - Gold record for L'arbre est dans ses feuilles, RIAA Canada
- 1978 - Gold Album for Migration, RIAA Canada
- 1980 - Prix de la jeune chansons française, République Française
- 1997 - Félix, l'ADISQ, Chanteur francophone le plus illustré au Québec
- 1997 - Officier l'Ordre des Arts et Lettres de la Rébublique Française
- 1998 - Membre l'Ordre des Francophones d'Amérique
- 1998 - Félix, l'ADISQ, Chanteur francophone le plus illustré au Québec
- 1998 - Prix Champlain, Conseil de la vie française en Amérique
- 1999 - Félix, l'ADISQ, Chanteur francophone le plus illustré au Québec
- 2000 - MéritasAcadien, Fédération Acadienne du Québec
- 2001 - Double Platinum album for Cap Enragé, RIAA Canada
- 2001 - Félix, l'ADISQ, Chanteur francophone le plus illustré au Québec
- 2002 - Prix Historia, L'institut d'Histoire de l'Amérique Française
- 2005 - PhD Honoraire en Musique, Honoris Causa, Université de Moncton, New Brunswick
- 2007 - Félix, l'ADISQ, Chanteur francophone le plus illustré au Québec
- 2007 - Chevalier, l'Ordre de la Pléiade
- 2008 - Honorary PhD in Fine Arts, Honoris Cause, University of Louisiana at Lafayette
- 2009 - PhD Honoraire en Littérature, Université Sainte-Anne, Nova Scotia
- 2009 - Order of Canada
- 2010 - Honorary member of Regroupement QuébecOiseaux

== See also ==
- History of Cajun Music
- List of Notable People Related to Cajun Music
