= Suzanne Lapointe =

Canadian singer, actress and television presenter

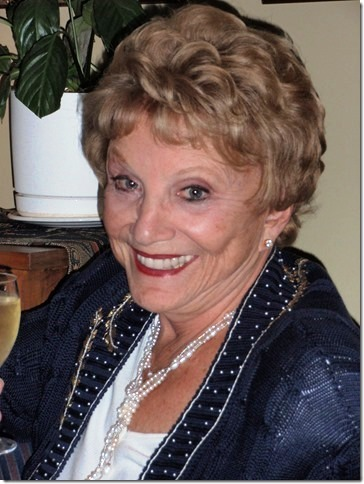
- Suzanne Lapointe (2009)
- Born: May 16, 1934; Montreal, Quebec, Canada
- Died: January 2, 2015 (aged 80); Sainte-Adèle, Quebec, Canada

Suzanne Lapointe, C.M. (16 May 1934 – 2 January 2015) was a Canadian singer, actress and television presenter.

== Biography ==
Suzanne Lapointe was born in Montreal on 16 May 1934, the second of six children of Armand Lapointe, a commercial traveler, and Lucette Brousseau, who created clothing. With a voice worthy of a prima donna, she went initially towards her study of singing as a young girl after her classical studies. Initiated by her singing aunt Marthe, who was a soprano for Variétés lyriques, she studied classical singing at the Conservatoire de musique du Québec à Montréal where she also studied acting with Jean Valcourt and drama in Sita Riddez's class. In 1959, she successfully auditioned to become a hostess on the television show La Poule aux oeufs d'or, which became a gateway to the artistic field in Quebec. In 1960, she received a grant from the Canada Council for the Arts, which allowed her to spend two years singing in New York City. From time to time, she sang in television programs including L'heure du concert and Music-Hall.

An outstanding cook, Lapointe animated Attention c'est chaud on Télévision de Radio-Canada, a show on cooking with young chef Daniel Vézina, and published more than twelve books of recipes from 1970 to 1984, including La cuisine de maman Lapointe and Plaisir de recevoir. However, her career reached a peak in 1987 when she co-animated Les Démons du midi with comedian Gilles Latulippe. Their madness and laughter invaded homes around Quebec every day of the week for six years with a total of 1,050 shows, Suzanne's unique and communicative laughter being a distinctive sign. Having survived breast cancer in the mid-1990s shortly after her husband's death, she became very involved in the cause to find a cure.

In 2009, the Order of Canada introduced:

For more than 50 years, Suzanne Lapointe has held a special place in the artistic community and in the heart and soul of Quebec society. She distinguished herself mainly as the host and co-host of a number of radio and television programs that have been described as "the people’s morning education". Notably, she co-hosted the daily show, "Les Démons du Midi", which had almost all of Quebec glued to the television between noon and one o’clock. Her sense of humour, her infectious laugh and her unaffectedness are legendary. She is also known as the author of a series of very successful cookbooks. Involved in a number of causes, she is a member of the board of the Fondation de l’Hôpital régional de Saint-Jérôme, has led fundraising campaigns and has travelled all across Quebec as a spokesperson for the breast cancer screening program.

— Grounds highlighted by the Order of Canada for the memorial badge, Governor General to invest 45 recipients into the Order of Canada,

Without children and a widow of Pierre Larin for about twenty years, but surrounded by her four surviving sisters (Louise, Andrée, Claire and Isabelle) and their children, she was suffering from Alzheimer's disease for a few years before she died from lymphoma on 2 January 2015 at a retirement home in Sainte-Adèle where she lived for four months.

== Honours ==
- 2006: Knight of the Order of La Pléiade
- 2008: Member of the Order of Canada (insignia passed on 15 May 2009)
