= Volodymyr Mezentsev =

Canadian historian (born 1953)

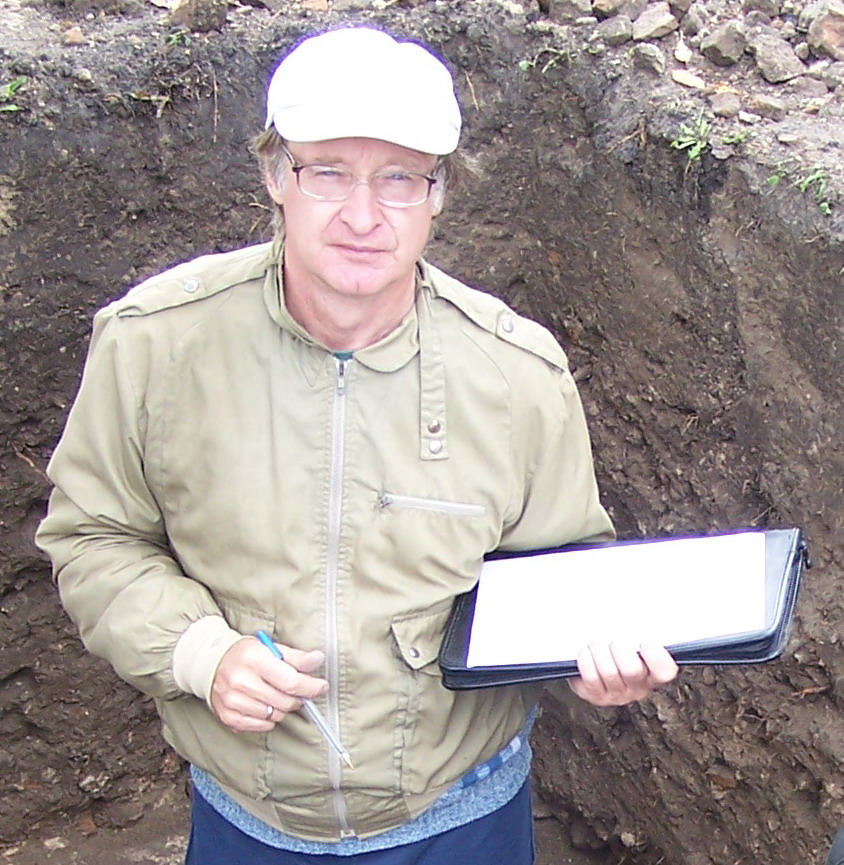
- Born: Volodymyr Mezentsev; 27 September 1953 (age 72); Kyiv Soviet Union
- Education: Taras Shevchenko National University of Kyiv
- Occupations: archeologyst, historian
- Known for: history of Ukraine

Volodymyr Mezentsev (Ukrainian: Володимир Мезенцев; born 27 September 1953) is a Canadian and Ukrainian historian specializing in medieval and modern Ukrainian and Byzantine archaeology, history, architecture and art. From 1987 to 2002 he worked at the Pontifical Institute of Medieval Studies (Toronto, Canada).

== Early life and education ==
Volodymyr Mezentsev was born in Kyiv, (Ukraine). Mezentsev's parents was of Ukrainian scientists. After his studies, he received a doctor of philosophy degree and began a scientific career. Mezentsev was a research associate with the Institute of History of the National Academy of Sciences of Ukraine, Kyiv. In 1983, during a foreign scientific mission to Norway, he didn't return to the Soviet Union. He emigrated as political refugees to the United States, later to Canada.

Volodymyr Mezentsev completed his post-doctoral studies at the Harvard Ukrainian Research Institute (1984–1987) and the University of Toronto (1988–1989).

== Career ==
During 1987–2002 Mezentsev was a research associate at the Pontifical Institute of Mediaeval Studies at the University of Toronto. Since 2022 he is a Research Associate the University of Alberta's Canadian Institute of Ukrainian Studies responsible for the Canada-Ukraine Baturyn Archaeological Project.

Mezentsev's areas of research have included Ukrainian Baroque architecture and decoration, as well as the influence of Byzantine and West European arts on Ukraine-Rus’. He has taught courses on Ukrainian medieval art, on Byzantine, Eastern Christian, and Ukrainian church architecture, and on Slavic civilization at the University of Toronto, the Metropolitan Andrey Sheptytsky Institute at St. Paul University in Ottawa, and the summer school of the Ukrainian Catholic University in L’viv.

In 2001, he organized the Canada-Ukraine archaeological expedition conducting annual excavations in Baturyn. He is the executive director of the Canadian Institute of Ukrainian Studies Baturyn project, dealing extensively with its publications, logistics, and promotion in Canada and the US.

In 2009, the Viktor Yushchenko awarded Mezentsev the Order of Merit for his significant contribution to the research and preservation of the historical and cultural heritage of Baturyn.

== Selected publications ==
Mezentsev is the author of more than 300 publications.

== Articles ==
- Herasko M. Volodymyr Mezentsev i Baturyn // Slovo Hetmanskoi stolytsi. 2010. № 4(22).(in Ukrainian).
- Borys Domots’kyi, “Zvytiazhna pratsia doktora Mezentseva”, Desnianka vil’na, No. 6 (409), Novhorod-Sivers’kyi, Ukraine, 19 January 2012.(in Ukrainian).
- Rostyslav Tryhub, “Volodymyr Mezentsev – ukrains’kyi istoryk z Kanady”, in the Internet journal Muzei Ukrainy, Kyiv, 27 January 2017. (in Ukrainian).
- Natalia Saienko, Karina Soldatova, “Rolia ukraintsiv svitu u vidrodzhenni istorii Baturyna”, Svoboda, Vol. 130, No. 13, Parsippany, N. J., 31 March 2023. Р. 12. (in Ukrainian).
