= Ecotoxicology (journal) =

- Discipline: Ecology, toxicology
- Language: English
- Edited by: Lee R. Shugart

Publication details
- History: 1992-present
- Publisher: Springer Science+Business Media
- Frequency: 10/year
- Impact factor: 2.329 (2015)

Standard abbreviations
- ISO 4: Ecotoxicology

Indexing
- CODEN: ECOTEL
- ISSN: 0963-9292 (print); 1573-3017 (web)
- LCCN: 94648542
- OCLC no.: 28329250

Links
- Journal homepage; Online archive

Ecotoxicology is a peer-reviewed scientific journal covering ecotoxicology. It was established in 1992 and is published ten times per year by Springer Science+Business Media. The editor-in-chief is Lee R. Shugart. According to the Journal Citation Reports, the journal has a 2015 impact factor of 2.329.
