= Centre for Forest Research =

Research institute in eastern Canada

The Centre for Forest Research (Centre d'Étude de la Forêt) is a group of researchers in eastern Canada interested in forest ecology and forest management. It is a new network created with the amalgamation of two research centres that had been operating in the province of Quebec, Canada. The present structure is built around 46 scientists from eight universities in the province.

Main research fields are ecophysiology, genetics, silviculture, entomology, ornithology, mycology and ecology. The research will link these disciplines with the development of innovative alternatives regarding the management of forested lands in the province.
