= Bird Protection Quebec =

Canadian organization

Bird Protection Quebec (Protection des oiseaux du Québec, BPQ) was founded in Montreal in 1917, and is the oldest organization of birders in Quebec.

BPQ exists to conserve wild birds and the environment. With the support of members, they own and manage nature reserves where wildlife can flourish, support research into the problems facing birds and the environment, help in recovery projects for many threatened species, and perform public outreach.

In fulfilling its mission, Bird Protection Quebec operates under these "guiding principles" and values:

- Wildlife, and birds in particular, have intrinsic value. There is value in appreciating the beauty and grace of birds, how they live and what they are able to do
- It is of the utmost importance to conserve bird populations and their habitats
- Knowledge of birds, particularly scientific knowledge, constitutes an important element in the understanding of the natural environment
- Laws should be enacted and enforced to protect birds and their habitats.

== History ==
Bird Protection Quebec was founded in 1917 as the Province of Quebec Society for the Protection of Birds (PQSPB).

In 2009, PQSPB transferred its archives to the McCord Museum of Canadian History in Montreal.

Margaret Arnaudin's book, The Official History of Bird Protection Quebec – A Bird in the Bush, documents the history of BPQ from its inception to 2002.

== Members' activities ==
- Regular field trips are organized throughout the year.
- Monthly meetings with knowledgeable speakers.
- The Song Sparrow - a newsletter sent to members to keep them in touch with activities.
- E-newsletter sent to members monthly.

Other regular activities are available to members such as the Christmas bird counts, in which society members take an active part in common with birders all over North and Central America, trips and outings, contests, courses, information and many other things.
