= COVID-19 pandemic in Quebec =

COVID-19 viral pandemic in Quebec, Canada

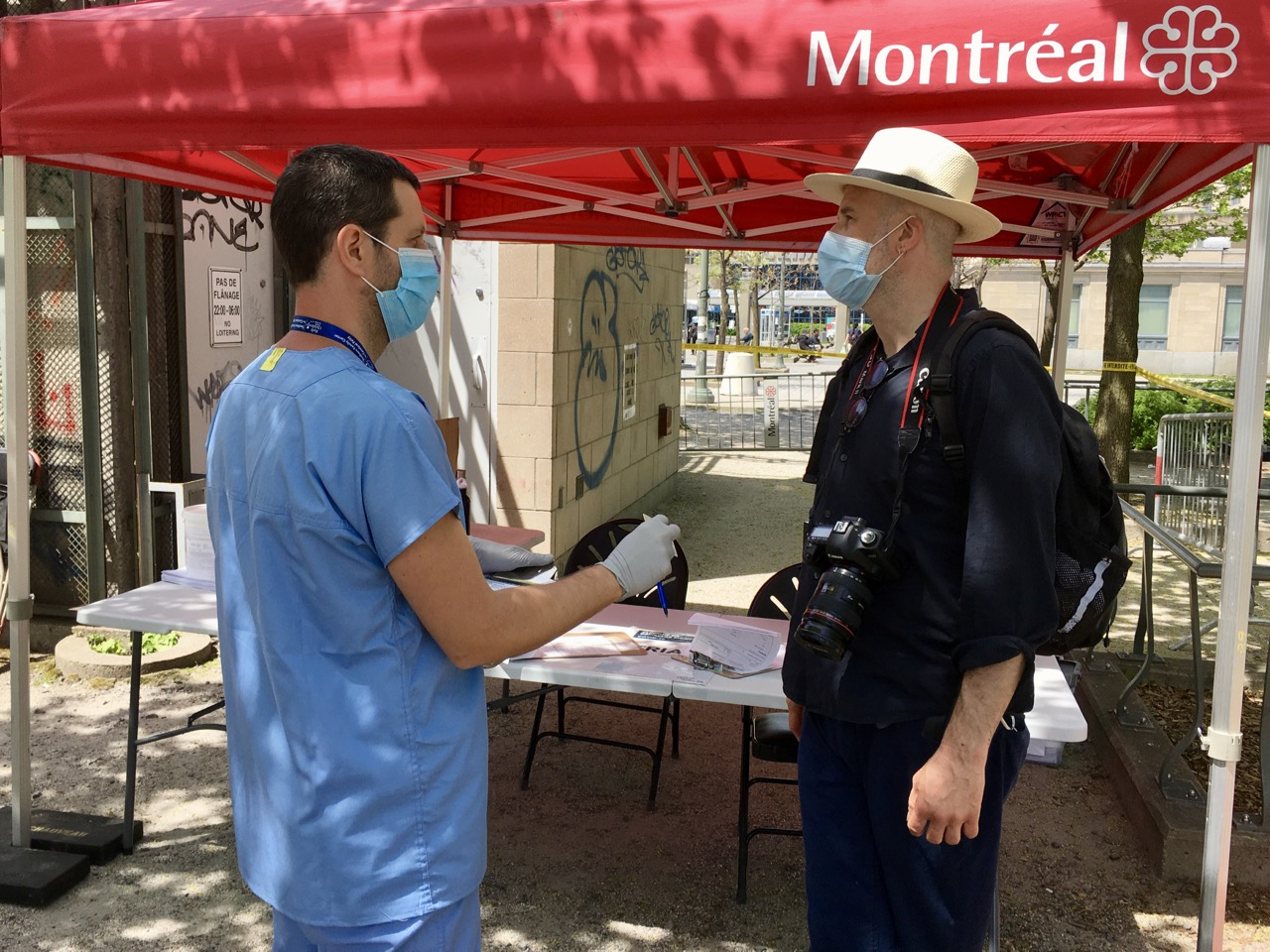
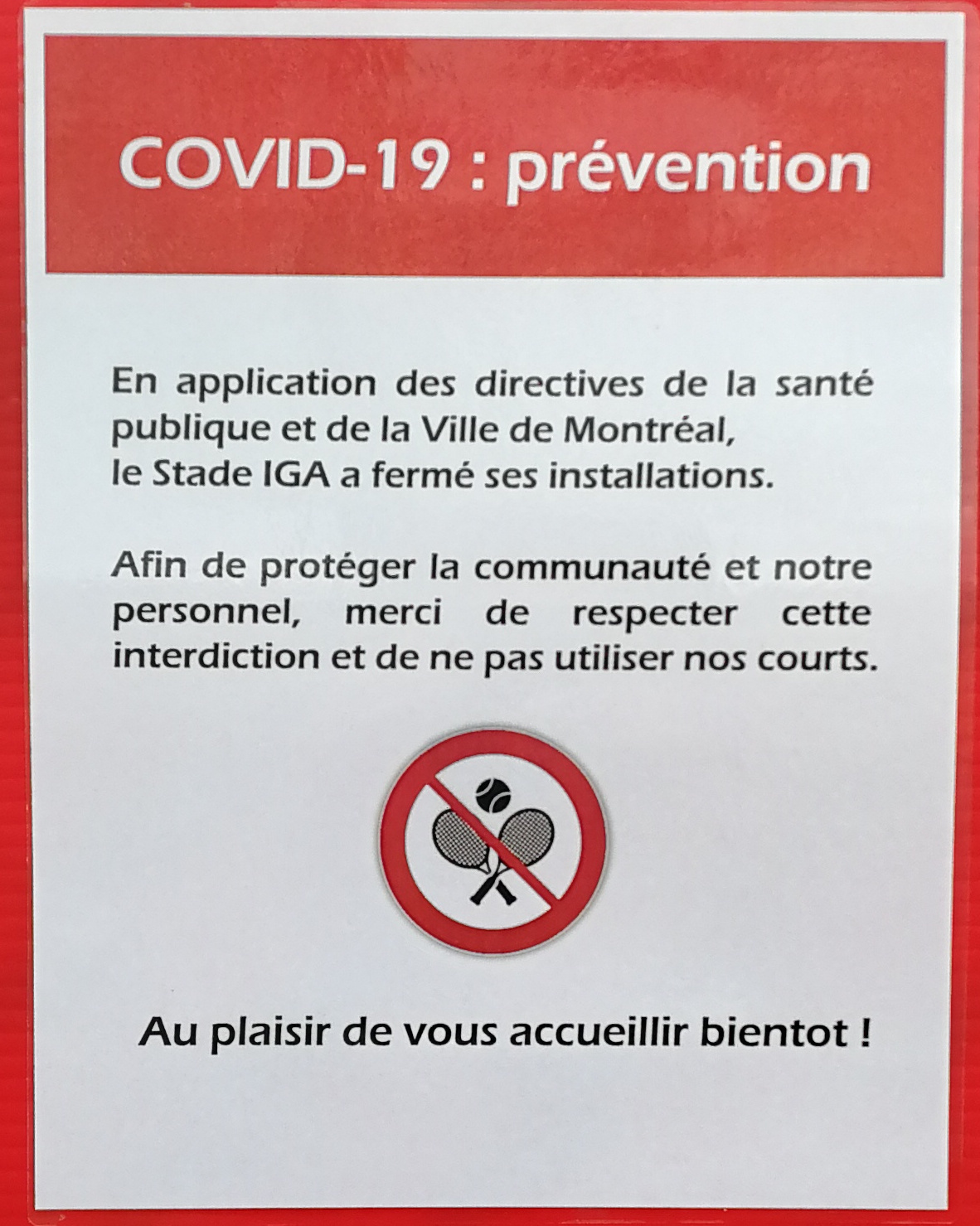
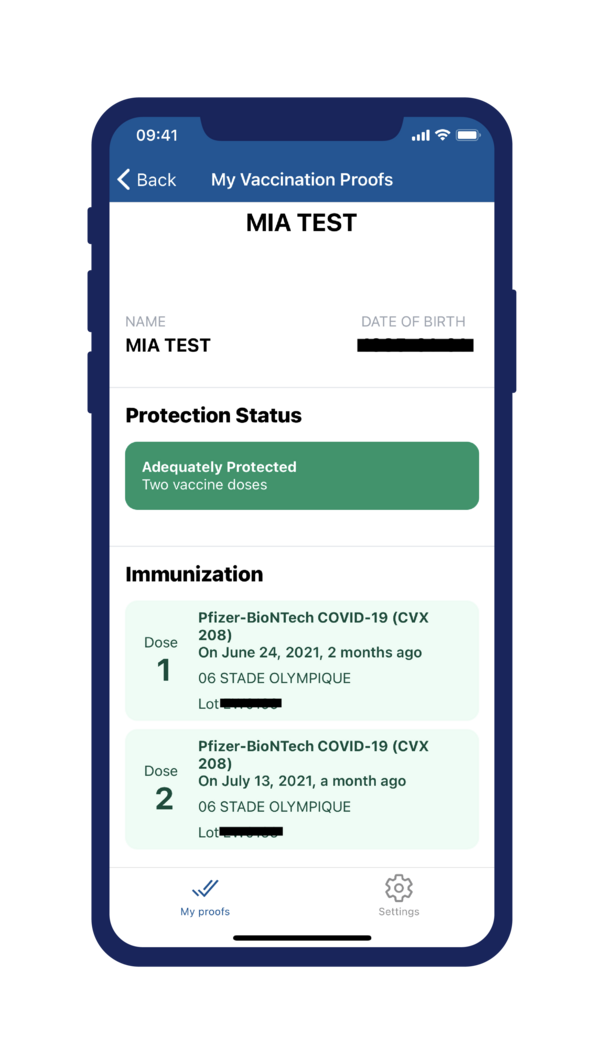
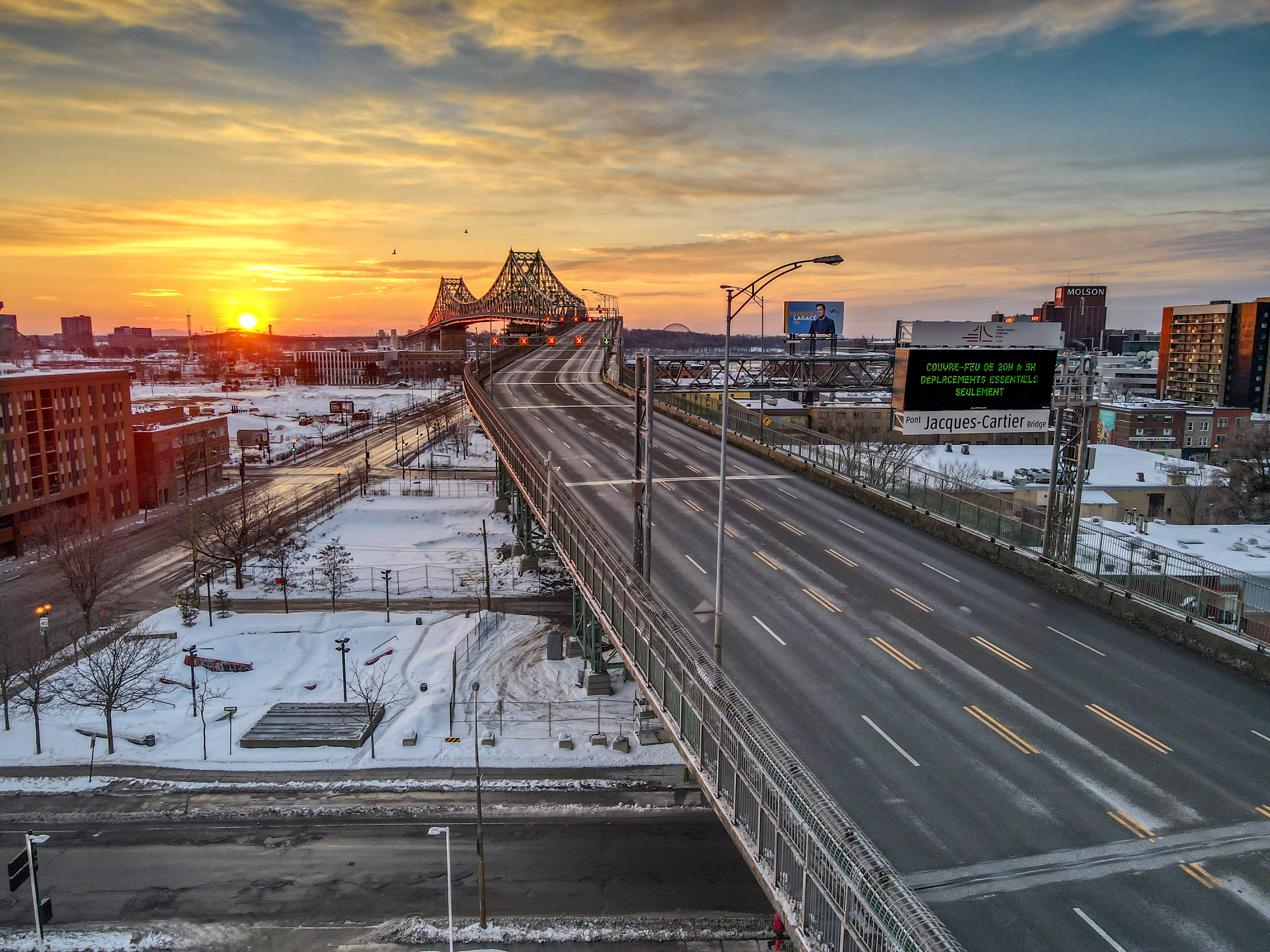
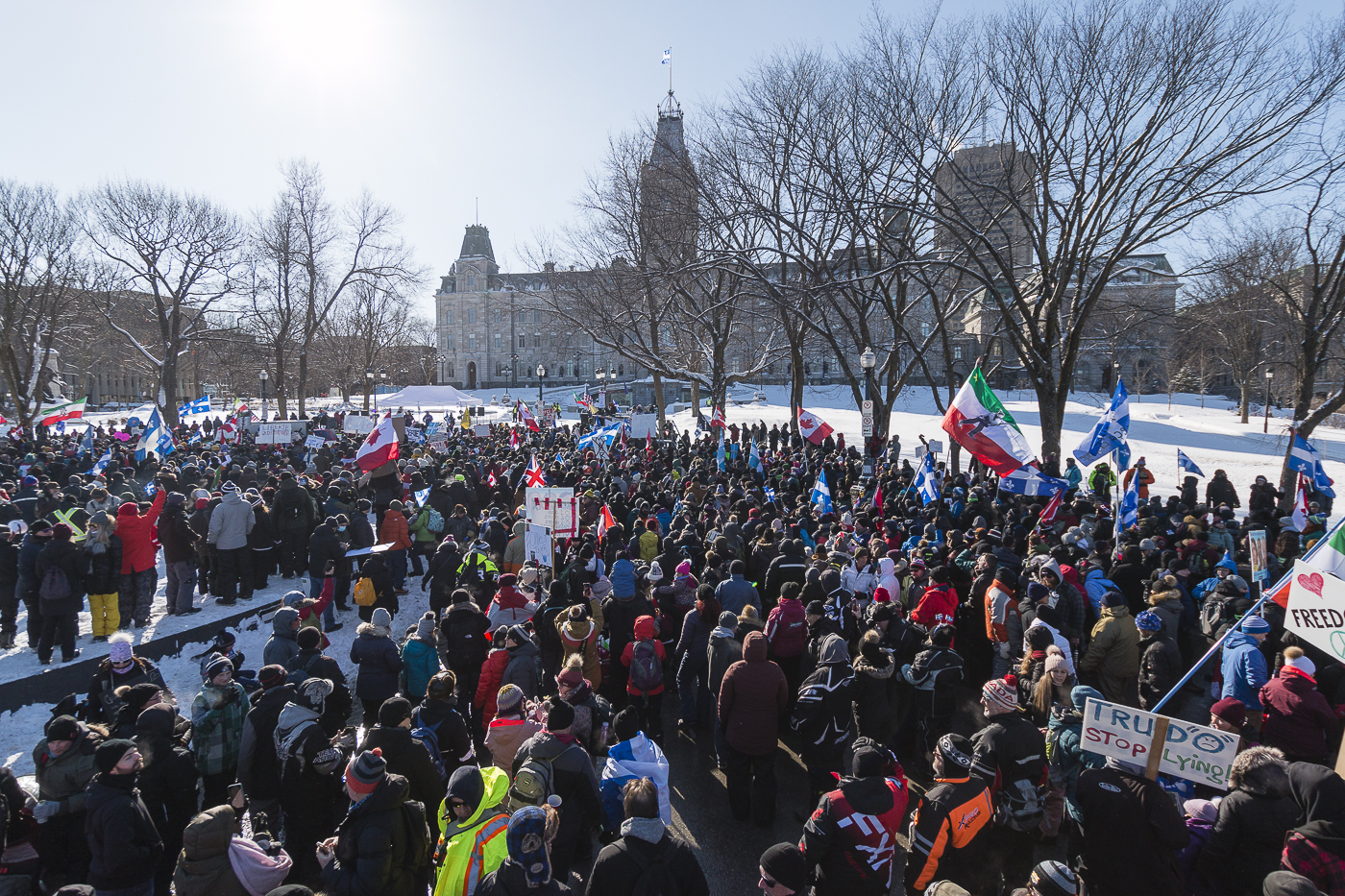
- (clockwise from top): A healthcare worker speaking to a patient at a mobile testing clinic in Montreal; A sign announcing the closure of a major tennis stadium; A sample of a valid vaccination passport using the VaxiCode app; An empty Jacques Cartier Bridge during curfew; Freedom Convoy protesters in front of the National Assembly
- Disease: COVID-19
- Pathogen: SARS-CoV-2
- Location: Quebec, Canada
- First outbreak: Wuhan, Hubei, China
- Index case: Montreal
- Arrival date: February 27, 2020
- Date: April 3, 2024
- Confirmed cases: 1,454,160 (Note: This figure may not represent the current epidemiological situation — the Quebec government restricted PCR COVID-19 tests to certain vulnerable groups on January 4, 2022.)
- Hospitalized cases: 1,141
- Deaths: 20,009
- Fatality rate: 1.38%
- Vaccinations: 84.8% vaccinated with at least one dose

Government website
- Quebec Government; COVID-19 data in Quebec (French only)

The COVID-19 pandemic in Quebec was part of the global pandemic of coronavirus disease 2019 (COVID-19), a novel infectious disease caused by severe acute respiratory syndrome coronavirus 2 (SARS-CoV-2).

Until 2021, Quebec had reported the highest number of COVID-19 cases in Canada, eventually overtaken by the neighbouring province of Ontario. However, as of 2024, Quebec still reported both the highest number and the highest rate of deaths in the country. This is largely due to poor conditions in long-term care homes, where around 80% of deaths in the first wave (March to June 2020) occurred.

Over the course of the first two years of the pandemic, Quebec underwent four lockdowns, corresponding to the four major waves of the virus. COVID-19 propagation tended to follow a seasonal pattern of intensification in the colder months (September to March), resulting in the tightening of measures, and reduction in the warmer months (April to August), resulting in the relaxation of measures. The purported goal of the lockdowns was to lessen the burden on the already overloaded healthcare system by reducing severe COVID-19 cases, also known more colloquially as the flatten the curve (aplatir la courbe) strategy. In total, the largest population centres of the province were under significant restrictions, which generally comprised the closure of non-essential businesses and the banning of most indoor gatherings, for 15 months. Many major events were cancelled for both 2020 and 2021, including the Formula One Canadian Grand Prix in Montreal. Controversially, a curfew was put in place province-wide from January to June 2021 and for the first two weeks of January 2022, despite concerns about the effectiveness of curfews to reduce cases. All measures were dropped in the second quarter of 2022, with the provincial state of emergency ending on June 1. Though Quebec took a comparatively harsh approach to public health restrictions, the provincial government, led by Premier François Legault, emphasized keeping schools open for as long as possible, despite initial pushback citing superspreader events. As a result, schools were fully remote for a total of only about 145 days, compared to 220 days in Ontario.

The vaccination campaign started in December 2020 and was rolled out over the next few months in descending order from the most vulnerable groups to the least vulnerable. In May 2021, vaccination against COVID-19 was extended to all adults in Quebec. By the end of that year, Quebec had a vaccination rate among the highest in the developed world, with over 80% of the population having at least one dose. Nonetheless, in September 2021 the province was the first in Canada to institute a vaccine passport for places considered to be high-risk, including restaurants, theatres, gyms, and bars. The vaccine passport was retired in March 2022.

From the start of the pandemic to January 2022, announcements about the current epidemiological situation and related public health measures took place every weekday in a press conference hosted by Premier Legault, the Minister of Health, and the National Public Health Director. The latter, Horacio Arruda, became the well-known and well-liked figurehead of the COVID-19 pandemic in Quebec until his resignation in January 2022. Financial aid programs, most of which ended in 2022, were also announced early in the pandemic for sectors that were not already covered by federal financial aid programs and that were particularly affected by pandemic closures, such as public transportation, restaurants, hotels, and theatres.

== Timeline ==
The pandemic first spread to Quebec in late February 2020, with the first confirmed case being a 41-year-old woman from Montreal who had returned from Iran on a flight from Doha, Qatar. Quebec declared its first Public Health Emergency in its history on March 14, 2020, and it was renewed every 10 days until June 1, 2022, when it was officially ended.

On March 15, 2020, the government enforced the closure of various entertainment and recreational venues, and on March 23, all non-essential businesses were ordered to close. By the end of March, over four and a half thousand cases had been confirmed in all regions of the province. Most deaths occurred in long-term care homes, where the situation became so critical that reinforcements from the Canadian Army were deployed in May. In May and June, the number of daily cases saw a steep decline, leading to the relaxation of some health restrictions. However, beginning in the third quarter of 2020, a second wave of the virus began to emerge in Quebec and throughout Canada. In September 2020, certain restrictions, including the prohibition of private gatherings and the closure of indoor dining rooms, were reinstated in the greater areas of Montreal and Quebec City. As the end of the year approached, cases continued to rise, with daily case counts periodically breaking provincial records, prompting the Quebec government to tighten restrictions further and expand them to more regions. By early December, Quebec had reached a total of 100,000 cases of COVID-19.

Following Health Canada's approval of the Pfizer–BioNTech COVID-19 vaccine and the Moderna COVID-19 vaccine, the vaccination campaign began in Quebec on December 14, 2020, with the first vaccine in Canada given to a Quebec City long-term care home resident.

Quebec entered a province-wide lockdown on December 25, 2020 (Christmas Day) and implemented a curfew on January 9, 2021. In February 2021, as a result of a decline in cases, Quebec began to reopen the economy regionally, allowing for non-essential businesses to reopen. Schools, which had briefly moved to fully remote instruction, also reopened for in-person classes. The respite proved to be short-lived; soon after, in April, the reopening was reversed due to a third wave driven by new variants of the virus, especially the Alpha variant. Notably, gyms were forced to close again, capacity limits for places of worship were lowered, and a mixed model of in-person and remote instruction was enacted in high schools.

As cases began to fall in tandem with the acceleration of the vaccination campaign in May, restrictions started to loosen, with the curfew ending on May 28 in the entire province. Restrictions were expected to continue to gradually lift over the summer, with the mask mandate meant to end at the end of August, but a fourth wave halted these plans. In order to avoid another lockdown as a result of the fourth wave, the province instituted a vaccine passport system on September 1, 2021, becoming one of the first provinces in Canada to do so. Despite this measure, a partial lockdown began on December 20, 2021, as the highly contagious Omicron variant generated record numbers of new cases. The lockdown was tightened on New Year's Eve, with restaurants being forced to close for indoor dining, private gatherings prohibited, and a curfew reinstated, despite continuing concerns about the effectiveness of curfews to reduce cases.

Protests against COVID-19 vaccine mandates and restrictions swept across Canada in January and February 2022 as the Omicron wave was dying down. Shortly after, several provinces began announcing the end of all measures, including mask mandates and the vaccine passport. Quebec, which had implemented some of the strictest measures in North America during the Omicron wave, took the least permissive approach among the provinces; in February 2022, with an estimated three million Quebecers having had contracted COVID-19, they announced a reopening plan that would include the gradual suspension of the vaccine passport by March 12 while maintaining the mask mandate, which had been in effect since July 2020. Finally, on May 14, 2022, the mask mandate for most indoor spaces was lifted, making Quebec the last province to do so. However, masks remained mandatory in healthcare facilities, including hospitals and medical clinics, until April 7, 2023. The province also stopped recommending that everyone get a booster COVID-19 vaccine dose.

== Vaccination ==
Quebec received their first shipments of COVID-19 vaccines on December 13, 2020. Priority vaccination of long-term care home residents and healthcare workers began the next day, with an 89-year-old resident of a long-term care home in Quebec City being the first in the province and country to receive a vaccine. On March 1, 2021, vaccination of the general population began, starting with people 80 years of age or older in Montreal. Over the course of the next three months, the vaccination campaign was gradually expanded to each age group in descending order. By May 14, all adults in Quebec were able to book a vaccination appointment, and by June 6, 75% of eligible Quebecers had received at least one dose of a vaccine. By mid-January 2022, all adults were eligible to receive a third dose of a COVID-19 vaccine.

From September 1, 2021, to March 12, 2022, a vaccine passport was required to enter restaurants, bars, gyms, and indoor venues, among other places. For a short time, it was also required for big-box stores, provincial alcohol stores, and provincial cannabis stores.

Timeline of the COVID-19 regional alert level system in Quebec Vigilance Early warning Alert Maximum alert Maximum alert with special emergency measures Special measures

== Progressive regional alert and intervention system ==
On September 8, 2020, the province unveiled a four-tier, colour-coded system of regional health restrictions based on caseload and healthcare capacity. Tiers ranged from green to red, with each tier imposing progressively more severe restrictions than the last. Initially, only the most populated areas of Montreal and Quebec City were in the red zone. However, by the time the winter wave hit its peak a few months later, all 18 regions of the province were in either the orange or red zone. Over the remainder of the winter, into spring, Quebec slowly downgraded the alert level in each region. By June 28, 2021, all regions had entered the green zone, bringing an end to the regional alert system.

Throughout its entire duration, all tiers were subject to physical distancing, mandatory masking, and basic hygiene practices.

Quebec progressive regional alert and intervention system as of June 28, 2021
Level	Description
1 - Vigilance	Residents urged to remain vigilant and practise all basic health guidance.: Private gatherings limited to 10 people from different households if held indoors, or 20 people if held outdoors. Social distancing and masks strongly recommended for people who are not fully vaccinated but not required.; Weddings, funerals, and religious gatherings limited to 250 people.; Restaurants open with a maximum of 10 people per table if indoors, or 20 people if outdoors.; Indoor venues, such as stadiums and cinemas, limited to 500 people per section for a total of 7,500 people. Masks can be taken off once seated, as long as social distancing is maintained.; Outdoor venues limited to 15,000 people.; Bars, brasseries, casinos, and taverns open with a maximum of 10 people per table if indoors, or 20 people if outdoors. Must end alcohol sales by 1:00 a.m. and close by 2:00 a.m.; Sports competitions allowed with a maximum of 25 spectators if held indoors, or 50 spectators if held outdoors.
2 - Early Warning	Actions may be taken to strengthen enforcement and compliance with existing basic measures: Private indoor gatherings limited to the residents of two households.; Private outdoor gatherings limited to 8 people from different households or the residents of two households.; Religious gatherings limited to 250 people.; Weddings and funerals limited to 50 people.; Restaurants open with a maximum of two households per table.; Bars, brasseries, casinos, and taverns open with a maximum of two households per table. Must end food and drink sales by midnight and close by 2:00 a.m. Must maintain log of customers' information for contact tracing purposes.; Venues, such as stadiums and cinemas, limited to 250 people per section. Masks can be taken off once seated, as long as social distancing is maintained.
3 - Alert	Stronger restrictions and compliance measures are enforced to mitigate a heightened risk of infection: Private indoor gatherings prohibited with exceptions made for certain groups.; Private outdoor gatherings of either a maximum of 8 people from different households or the residents of two households allowed.; Religious gatherings limited to 100 people.; Weddings and funerals limited to 25 people.; Bars, brasseries, casinos, and taverns closed.; Museums, zoos, aquariums, libraries, and cinemas open.; Restaurants open with a maximum of either 2 adults from different households, accompanied by their minor children, or residents of the same household permitted per table.; Indoor visits in long-term care homes restricted to 1 verified informal caregiver per day.; Outdoor visits in long-term care homes restricted to 5 people per day.; Stadiums open but limited to a total of 2,500 people, with a limit of 250 people per section.; Gyms open and indoor sports permitted. Group activities limited to pairs and members of the same household when indoors and to eight people when outdoors.; In-person extracurricular activities and field trips in schools permitted.
4 - Maximum Alert	Targeted measures are employed against high-risk activities to mitigate a strong risk of infection, while aiming to avoid a "generalized" lockdown: Private indoor gatherings prohibited with exceptions made for certain groups.; Private outdoor gatherings of either a maximum of 8 people from different households or the residents of two households allowed.; Religious gatherings limited to 25 people.; Funerals limited to 25 people.; Dine-in restaurants, bars, taverns, casinos closed. Restaurant patios open with a maximum of either 2 adults from different households, accompanied by their minor children, or residents of the same household permitted per table.; Museums, zoos, aquariums, libraries, and cinemas open.; Indoor visits in long-term care homes restricted to 1 verified informal caregiver per day.; Outdoor visits in long-term care homes restricted to 3 people per day.; Stadiums open but limited to a total of 2,500 people, with a limit of 250 people per section.; Gyms closed. Indoor sports permitted in certain facilities if done individually, in pairs, or by members of the same household.; In-person extracurricular activities prohibited, but field trips permitted.

== Impact ==
=== Economic and financial ===
A month after the pandemic arrived in Quebec, the Minister of Finance, Éric Girard, predicted a budget deficit of between $10 and $15 billion for the year 2020. These figures were based on the assumption that 40% of the Quebec economy would be put on pause for a period of eight weeks while health spending increased. However, the Quebec economy proved more resilient than expected; after revisions, the 2020 year saw a deficit of $4.2 billion, representing about 1% of GDP, and a real GDP contraction of 5.3%. In comparison to other Canadian provinces, this puts Quebec's economic performance at an above average level for the first year of the pandemic. The next year witnessed myriad other improvements, including further easing of the deficit and real GDP growth by 6%.

In the months leading up to the pandemic, Quebec had one of the lowest unemployment rates in the country, hovering around 5%. During the initial period of uncertainty in spring 2020, with the economy effectively shut down, the rate jumped to 17%, the highest it had ever been since records began in 1976. While jobs began to return over the rest of the year, the average unemployment rate for the 2020 year remained well above normal, at 8.9%. Despite additional waves of the virus, the downward trend continued, falling to 6.1% in 2021 and hitting a record low of 3.8% unemployment in November 2022.

The extent of the economic impact of the pandemic quickly sparked initiatives to promote local purchasing, including the #OnSeSerreLesCoudes ("We stick together") social media campaign. The Quebec government launched its own initiative, the Panier Bleu, which is a website that lists Quebecois retailers offering online sales. In October 2022, Panier Bleu became transactional, allowing users to make purchases on the site itself.

Hydro-Québec, a provincial Crown Corporation, announced that its executives would be renouncing their salary increase for 2020 and that the bonuses for 2019 would be paid later in the year. In addition, Hydro-Quebec donated 125,000 protective masks to the Quebec government.

==== Government aid ====
On March 16, 2020, the government of Quebec announced financial compensation to workers who had to quarantine after having travelled abroad. The program, named Programme d'aide temporaire aux travailleurs touchés par le coronavirus (PATT), paid $573 per week for two weeks to eligible workers.

On March 19, the Temporary Concerted Action Program for Businesses (PACTE) was introduced. The program, worth $2.5 billion, offered loans starting at $50,000 to businesses experiencing supply or delivery issues. Two weeks later, the Minister of the Economy, Pierre Fitzgibbon, announced $150 million in expenditure for an Emergency aid for small and medium-sized businesses program that aimed to fill the gap left by PACTE and make sure that smaller businesses, who needed loans of less than the minimum of $50,000, did not fall through the cracks. Both aid programs ended in June 2022.

On March 20, the government of Quebec announced that interest on student loans would be suspended for the next six months starting on April 1, 2020. This relief measure was later extended until March 31, 2023.

==== Layoffs ====
On March 15, 2020, the Antonopoulos group — owner of many hotels and restaurants in Old Montreal — announced to its employees that several layoffs were expected. Groupe Sportscene (owner of sports bar chain La Cage) laid off 2,200 of its 2,500 employees. Cirque du Soleil announced the temporary layoff of 4,679 employees, representing almost 95% of its workforce. On March 26, Cogeco Media announced that it would lay off 130 employees, representing a quarter of their workforce. On April 6, CAE announced the layoff of approximately 2,600 employees, representing just over a quarter of their workforce. Four months into the pandemic, with demand in the aerospace sector still well below normal, Bombardier announced a layoff of 2,500 workers.

Though most layoffs occurred in the private sector, on March 24, the City of Quebec laid off nearly 2,000 employees. On April 4, more than half of municipal workers in Donnacona were laid off. In Lévis, the city laid off 353 temporary employees for three weeks. Saint-Augustin-de-Desmaures and L'Ancienne-Lorette also laid off fifty employees.

In total, about 210,000 jobs were lost in Quebec in 2020.

=== Healthcare system ===
Since March 15, 2020, anyone who has left a health professional order, such as the Order of Nurses of Quebec, may begin practicing that profession again, without charge, as long as they have not been out of the order for more than 5 years, and are not over 70 years old.

On March 31, Premier Legault warned of potential shortages of medical supplies within the next week, including personal protective equipment, and announced that Premier of Ontario Doug Ford had agreed to divert some of its shipments of medical equipment to the province. The province of Alberta also announced on April 11 that they would be sending 250,000 N95 masks, 2 million procedural masks, and 15 million gloves to Quebec.

On April 2, a salary bonus of 8% to all healthcare professionals on the front line, including paramedics, and a bonus of 4% to the rest of the network's employees was announced by ministers Christian Dubé and Danielle McCann. A salary increase of $4.00 per hour was also granted to the 34,000 patient attendants in long-term care homes for a period of 16 weeks. A month later, a further bonus of up to $1,000 per month was given to full-time CHSLD workers. In September 2021, with the healthcare system still reeling from staff shortages, the Quebec government offered a lump-sum of $15,000 to new full-time nurses and $12,000 to former nurses who return to the practice. Existing nurses, meanwhile, could receive up to $18,000.

On April 5, the Quebec government began to centralize the purchase of drugs, and sought to find an alternative drug for propofol, out of fear of a shortage.

On May 5, Premier Legault revealed that 11,200 workers in the healthcare system were absent. Two days later, that number had increased to 11,600. Of the workers who were present, only 50% were working full-time.

The Fédération interprofessionnelle de la santé du Québec, a union representing healthcare workers, suggests that over the first year of the pandemic, 4,000 nurses in Quebec quit the profession. Despite government initiatives to try to entice new and former workers into the profession, staffing shortages continued to be problematic throughout the pandemic; nearly two years after its onset, an estimated 20,000 healthcare workers were missing. Indeed, a survey by Statistics Canada, conducted from September 2021 to November 2021, revealed that 12.7% of healthcare workers in Quebec wanted to leave their "current job" within the next two years, with nurses being the most likely to report intention to leave. Nonetheless, the Quebec government began phasing out many of their prime COVID initiatives in spring 2022, including pay bonuses.

=== Long-term care facilities ===
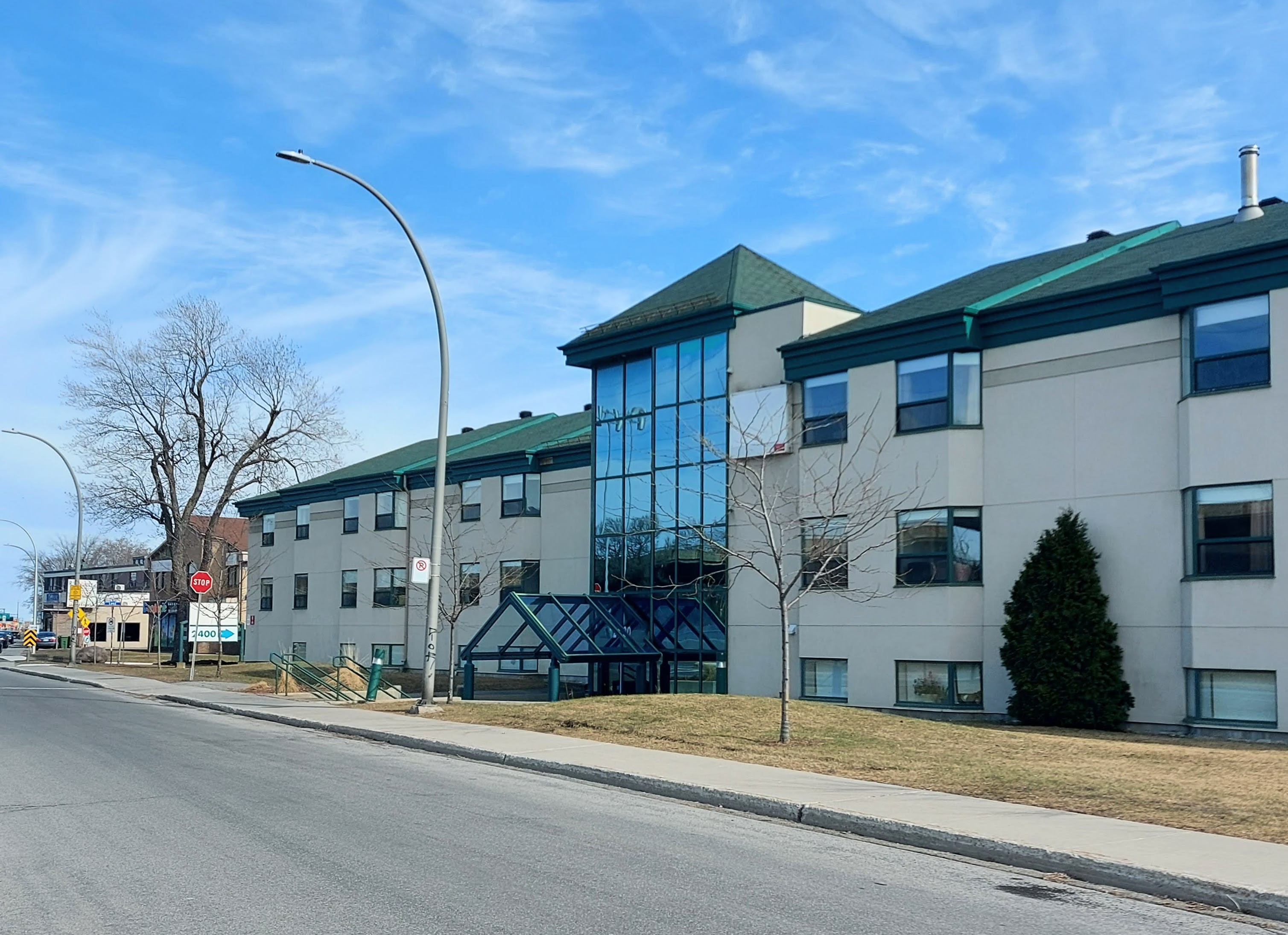
CHSLD Herron, where 47 long-term care residents died between March 13 and May 31, 2020.

As of April 1, 2020, 519 long-term care facilities in Quebec, including both lodging centres for long-term care (French: centre d'hébergement de soins de longue durée, CHSLD) and private seniors' residences (French: résidence privée pour aînés, RPA), had at least one confirmed case of COVID-19. As of April 30, a total of 6603 residents in CHSLDs and RPAs had been infected. Nearly half of Quebec's deaths from the pandemic have occurred in long-term care facilities.

CHSLD Sainte-Dorothee in Laval has had one of the largest outbreaks; on April 8, it was reported that at least 115 of its 250 residents had been infected, and that there had been at least 13 deaths. The same day, Premier Legault announced that the province would deploy 500 nurses, 450 doctors, and more equipment to long-term care facilities in order to help reduce their burden.

At least 150 cases have been connected to CHSLD Herron, located in the Montreal suburb of Dorval. There were also reports of neglect and poor living conditions at the facility, with staff having deserted the facility since March 29, and health care workers describing it as being akin to a horror movie or a concentration camp, due to discovering unhygienic living conditions, and residents neglected for nourishment and personal hygiene. On April 10, Health Minister McCann announced that an investigation would be launched into the facility, which had been placed under provincial trusteeship.

On April 11, the province reported that there had been 31 deaths at CHSLD Herron over the last month, with at least five attributed to COVID-19. CIUSSS de l'Ouest-de-l'Île-de-Montréal (CIUSSSOIM) president Lynne McVey stated that the facility's owner was uncooperative, preventing authorities from obtaining the health records of its residents until April 8. Quebec's coroner's office and the Montreal police are also investigating.

That weekend, teams were sent to all 41 private CHSLDs in the province to evaluate their response to the pandemic. On April 12, AELDPQ (an association representing Quebec's private CHSLDs) sent a letter to Minister McCann, accusing the province of breaking promises to increase funding for private CHSLDs, not displaying equal scrutiny towards public facilities, cutting off private facilities' procurement of personal protective equipment via provincial suppliers, and not providing promised emergency funding for them to purchase PPE (requiring them to cover their own costs).

On April 13, Premier Legault presented findings from the evaluations, reporting that the "vast majority" of private CHSLDs were "very well managed," but that there were several that required further monitoring and that the province would now be inspecting all 2,600 CHSLDs. He admitted that pre-existing issues with under-staffing at the facilities due to low wages may have been exacerbated by the pandemic, and announced plans to give temporary bonuses to attendants and orderlies, pending negotiations with unions to raise wages outright.

On April 14, Premier Legault announced that Quebec would allow residents of CHSLDs to receive visits from a pre-existing primary caregiver beginning April 16. The same day, the owners of CHSLD Herron sent a letter to Legault accusing CIUSSSOIM of engaging in a cover-up, claiming that 28 of the deaths reported had actually occurred after the facility was placed under trusteeship on March 29, disputing that they had not allowed them access to health records until April 8, and that "no communication was made to the families of the residents by the representatives of the CIUSSSOIM, despite numerous requests made to that effect by the employees as well as members of the management of the CHLSD Herron."

On April 16, the Montreal Regional Director of Public Health, Mylène Drouin, stated that outbreaks of COVID-19 had affected at least 75% of long-term care facilities in the city. Two days later, the Canadian Armed Forces began to deploy 125 workers — including nurses and other support staff — to assist CHSLDs in managing the outbreak and augmenting staff. On April 22, Premier Legault announced that the province had requested an additional 1,000 workers to "give us more resources to help us with non-medical tasks".

On May 5, 2020, Premier Legault announced that some restrictions in uninfected RPAs would be lifted, allowing residents to go for walks unaccompanied and to meet with family outdoors, as long as social distancing measures were being respected.

On June 4, 2021, the government announced that more restrictions would be lifted in CHSLDs and RPAs. In green zones, residents will be able to receive 9 visitors. In yellow zones, residents will be able to receive visitors from a single "bubble", usually consisting of one household.

On August 26, 2021, the investigation into CHSLD Herron ended with no criminal charges laid.

In 2021, an analysis conducted by two economists found that if Quebec had had similar rates of death in long-term care homes as in some European countries, up to 6,700 lives could have been saved.

=== Travel restrictions ===
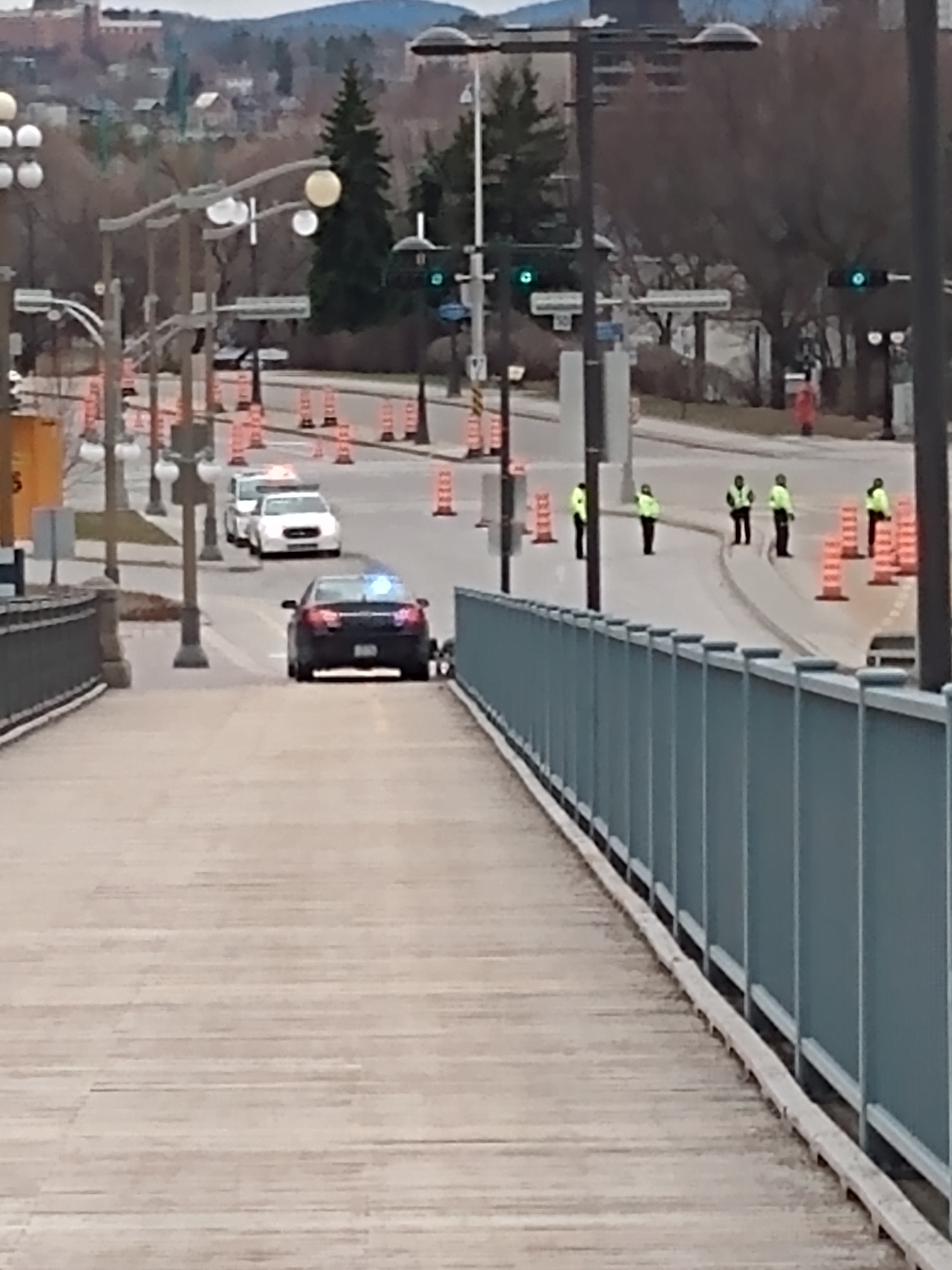
On April 1, 2020, border checkpoints such as this one on the Alexandra Bridge in Gatineau were implemented.

As of March 16, the Montréal–Trudeau International Airport is one of only four airports across the country that is accepting international flights to Canada from outside the Caribbean, Mexico, and the United States.

The Quebec government has advised against non-essential interprovincial travel. On March 28, regional access to the regions of Bas-Saint-Laurent, Abitibi-Témiscamingue, Côte-Nord, Saguenay—Lac-Saint-Jean, Gaspésie—Îles-de-la-Madeleine, Nord-du-Québec, Nunavik and Eeyou Istchee have been restricted by police roadblocks and airport controls.

On April 1, security checkpoints were implemented in several municipalities in the Lanaudiere region, the Laurentians, La Tuque, and the Outaouais region (including the Ontario border), to restrict non-essential travel into the regions.

=== Justice ===
From March 15, 2020 to June 1, 2020, all hearings before a judicial administrative court were mandated to be held behind closed doors. Visits from members of the public, excluding lawyers, to a detention facility were also suspended, with a partial resumption taking place on July 9, 2020 and a full resumption occurring in the fall. All decisions by the Rental Board authorizing the repossession of a dwelling or the eviction of a tenant were suspended from March 15, 2020 to July 6, 2020.

On March 16, all appeals to be heard by the Supreme Court of Canada in March, April and May 2020 were postponed to June 2020, just as the hearings convened from March 16 to April 30, 2020, before the Quebec Access to Information Commission were cancelled.

Between March 19, 2020 and May 5, 2020, orders made by the Court of Quebec that allowed children of the Direction de la protection de la jeunesse (child protective services) to maintain physical contact with their biological parents were suspended.

On March 20, individuals who served an intermittent sentence were on medical leave, and all deadline to introduce a case in front of the Tribunal administratif du Québec, the Tribunal administratif du travail, the Tribunal administratif des marchés financiers, or the Commission d'accès à l'information were suspended during the pandemic.

From March 23 to April 24, 2020, all deadlines for civil procedures were suspended, and only urgent cases were heard before the Quebec Court of Appeal, the Superior Court of Quebec and the Court of Quebec.

On April 1, the bar school of the province of Quebec postponed the final evaluation to May 25.

The curfew that lasted from January 9, 2021, to May 28, 2021, resulted in more than 20,000 fines, amounting to about $30 million.

=== Schools ===
On March 11, 2020, Premier Legault recommended that a voluntary 14-day quarantine be imposed on all students and faculty returning from school trips to countries strongly affected by the pandemic (such as China and Italy), even if there are no signs of symptoms. He also cancelled upcoming trips to such locations. The same day, students and staff members from several schools who had recently travelled to Italy were told to stay home. Collège International Marie de France suspended classes, pending the testing of a student who was suspected to have been infected. On March 13, the Université de Montréal cancelled all international teaching and research activities until the next school year.

On March 13, Quebec ordered the closure of all schools, CEGEPs, and post-secondary institutions until at least March 27. Daycares were also ordered closed, unless serving the children of health care professionals. On March 15, the government announced that it would offer free emergency childcare services for people working in essential services, with up to 60,000 spots available, using the up to 400 schools that the government had closed. On March 16, the Université Laval, the Université de Sherbrooke, and the École de technologie supérieure transitioned to online classes. Concordia University followed suit on March 23, and McGill University on March 30. Université Laval and Université de Sherbrooke established emergency funds for students impacted by the pandemic.

On March 22, the school closures were extended to May 1. On April 5, Quebec extended all closures relating to the pandemic through at least May 4.

There were calls by the students of the Université du Québec system for the winter terms to be cancelled outright, with Trois-Rivières students circulating a petition also requesting that they receive credits without a grade.

The province launched a website known as L'École Ouverte (Open School), which provides a collection of online education resources and activities in French and English.

On April 20, Minister of Education Jean-François Roberge announced that the province's R score system (typically used by universities to help select CEGEP applicants) would be suspended for the winter semester, so that students are not "unfairly penalized" due to a lack of uniformity in responses and approaches by Quebec's CEGEP's.

On April 27, Premier Legault announced that elementary schools and daycares would be allowed to reopen outside of the Montreal area on May 11, and within Montreal on May 18, if cases remain stable. Classes will be limited to 15 students each, and parents will be allowed to choose whether their children may return to classes. Secondary and post-secondary schools will not be re-opened until the next school year, to prevent overcrowding of public transit.

=== Research ===
On March 21, 2020, the provincial government awarded a $7 million grant to Medicago, a Quebec City-based firm that was developing a COVID-19 vaccine candidate. On March 23, a team at the Montreal Heart Institute led by Jean-Claude Tardif launched a clinical trial exploring the use of colchicine to help treat complications of COVID-19. The first results are expected for the month of June 2020.

On March 26, the Fonds de Recherche du Québec, and the Génome Québec, established a provincial task force to build a biobank of COVID-19 samples, led by McGill University chair Vincent Mooser. Mila, an artificial intelligence institute in Montreal, is developing contact tracing software for mobile phones.

=== Event cancellations ===
On March 12, 2020, Montreal and Quebec City cancelled their St. Patrick's Day parades (the former for the first time in its 196-year history). The Montreal Symphony Orchestra (OSM) cancelled concerts scheduled through May 24, 2020 (including a planned performance at New York City's Carnegie Hall). In 2022, the OSM cancelled their slate of concerts for January in response to the Omicron wave. All Grand Théâtre de Québec shows were cancelled through at least March 29. Various festivals have been cancelled, including the Festival d'été de Québec, Les Francos, Metro Metro, Montréal Complètement Cirque, the Montreal International Jazz Festival, and the Festival Santa Teresa. Montreal's Just for Laughs comedy festival was postponed to late September and early October. The Montreal Fireworks Festival was also cancelled in 2020, and then returned in a modified, limited capacity format in 2021.

On April 7, Montreal ordered the cancellation of all cultural events, festivals, public gatherings, and sporting events through July 2 (resulting in the cancellation of local Saint-Jean-Baptiste Day and Canada Day festivities). On April 10, Quebec requested that all cultural events, festivals, and sporting events be cancelled province-wide through at least August 31.

==== Sports ====
The National Hockey League and Major League Soccer suspended their regular seasons, affecting the Montreal Canadiens and Montreal Impact. With Major League Baseball suspending preseason play, the Toronto Blue Jays' annual preseason series at Olympic Stadium was also cancelled. The QMJHL and the remainder of the Canadian Hockey League scrapped the remainder of the 2019–20 season (including all playoffs and the Memorial Cup) on March 23. The 2020 World Figure Skating Championships, planned to be hosted by Montreal, were cancelled on March 11. On April 7, Formula One postponed the Canadian Grand Prix. In 2021, it was announced that the Grand Prix would be cancelled for a second year in a row.

On April 11, Tennis Canada announced that the women's tournament of the 2020 Rogers Cup would be postponed, pursuant to the request by the provincial government. The men's tournament in Toronto was ultimately postponed in June. Montreal will therefore host the women's tournament (now the National Bank Open) in 2021.

Other provincial sports bodies also suspended activities, including Basketball Québec, Baseball Québec (baseball activity suspended until at least May 1), Hockey Québec (including the Quebec Junior Hockey League, which called off the remainder of the season), and Soccer Québec (activity suspended until at least May 1). Other local events that have faced cancellations include the Tour de l'Île de Montréal, and various footraces.

On April 15, 2020, the organizers of the Grand Prix Cycliste de Montréal and Grand Prix Cycliste de Québec — the two North American events on the UCI World Tour — stated that the events were still tentatively scheduled for September, but that they would continue monitoring the situation and working with UCI on the matter.

The 2020–21 QMJHL season was met with multiple disruptions due to fluctuating public health orders in Quebec and Atlantic Canada, although it completed its regular season, and was the only CHL league to crown a champion (the WHL played a limited regular season within its divisions only, and the OHL did not play due to Ontario public health orders). During the 2020–21 NHL season, all Montreal Canadiens regular season games were played behind closed doors and against Canadian opponents only. During their May 29, 2021 playoff game, the Canadiens became the first Canadian NHL team to admit limited ticketed spectators in the season

From August 2020 to July 2021, the Montreal Impact (renamed CF Montreal prior to the 2021 Major League Soccer season) and all other Canadian MLS teams played all matches behind closed doors at sites in the United States. Beginning July 17, the team returned to Saputo Stadium with reduced capacity.

WWE was scheduled to hold a house show at Laval's Place Bell on December 30, 2021, which would have been the first time WWE performed a show at the venue in two years. The event was postponed to March 6, 2022, due to the restrictions imposed by Minister Dubé in response to the Omicron variant of COVID-19.

== See also ==
- COVID-19 pandemic in Canada
- COVID-19 pandemic in Montreal
- 2022 monkeypox outbreak in Canada
