= COVID-19 pandemic in Montreal =

Ongoing COVID-19 viral pandemic in Montreal, Quebec, Canada

- Disease: COVID-19
- Pathogen: SARS-CoV-2
- Location: Montreal, Quebec, Canada
- First outbreak: Wuhan, Hubei, China
- Index case: Montreal
- Arrival date: February 27, 2020
- Date: April 3, 2024
- Confirmed cases: 385,462 (Note: This figure may not represent the current epidemiological situation — the Quebec government restricted PCR COVID-19 tests to certain vulnerable groups on January 4, 2022.)
- Deaths: 6,319
- Fatality rate: 1.64%
- Vaccinations: 88% vaccinated with at least one dose; 84% fully vaccinated

Government website
- Santé Montréal; INSPQ

The COVID-19 pandemic in Montreal was part of the global pandemic of coronavirus disease 2019 (COVID-19), a novel infectious disease caused by severe acute respiratory syndrome coronavirus 2 (SARS-CoV-2). Until April 2021, Montreal was the worst affected health region in Canada. Despite being surpassed by Toronto in total number of cases, Montreal still has the highest total death count and the highest death rate in Canada, with the death rate from COVID-19 being two times higher on the island of Montreal than in the city of Toronto due in large part to substantial outbreaks in long-term care homes. Montreal is Canada's second most populous city, the largest city in Quebec, and the eighth most populous city in North America.

Montreal confirmed its first case of COVID-19 on February 27, 2020. The patient was a 41-year-old woman who had returned from Iran three days earlier on a flight from Doha, Qatar.

In early March 2020, the closure of public spaces, including stores, gyms, shopping malls, and schools, began. On March 27, with nearly 1,000 confirmed cases, Montreal declared a state of emergency. The first wave of COVID-19 lasted until early summer, at which point the economy started to gradually reopen, with daily case counts dropping into the double digits. In September 2020, facing the possibility of a second wave, the Quebec government announced a colour-coded alert level system made up of four zones (green, yellow, orange, and red), with restrictions being least severe in green zones and most severe in red zones. On September 30, Montreal was placed in the red zone.

Over the next few months, the second wave continued to worsen, prompting renewed closures and eventually, a province-wide lockdown, which came into effect on December 25 (Christmas Day). On January 9, a curfew came into effect. The lockdown ended a month later, allowing for non-essential businesses to reopen.

In December 2020, the vaccination campaign began, starting with residents of long-term care homes and healthcare workers. On March 1, 2021, only a year after the arrival of the pandemic, mass vaccination of the general population began.

At the end of March 2021, as the second wave was dying down, some restrictions were lifted, including the closure of gyms, theatres, and show venues. Not even two weeks later, the reopening was reversed due to a third wave driven by the Alpha variant. However, unlike the first and second waves, Montreal and its surrounding areas were not the hotspot of the province during the third wave, managing to endure it with only a minimal to non-existent rise in cases, hospitalizations, and deaths. Towards the end of May, with over 50% of the island's population vaccinated with at least one dose, restrictions started to gradually lift, with the curfew ending on May 28 in all regions of Quebec. On June 7, after about eight months in the red zone, Montreal moved into the orange zone, allowing gyms and dine-in restaurants to open, and on June 14, they moved into the yellow zone, allowing bars to reopen. Finally, on June 28, Montreal moved into the zone with the fewest restrictions, the green zone. Two months later, Montreal ended its state of emergency.

With the rise of the Omicron variant, the Quebec government reintroduced province-wide restrictions in December 2021, forcing gyms, restaurants, and other establishments to close, despite the vaccine passport requirement in these settings and a high vaccination rate in Montreal. During the first two weeks of 2022, Montreal was subject to a contentious curfew from 10:00 p.m. to 5:00 a.m.

Restrictions began to loosen in February 2022, and by mid-March, almost all COVID-19 measures in Montreal had been lifted, with the notable exception of the mask mandate. Finally, on May 14, 2022, the mask mandate for most indoor spaces was lifted.

== Impact ==
The COVID-19 pandemic had significant social, economic, and healthcare impacts in Montreal. During the early stages of the pandemic, Montreal became one of the hardest-hit regions in Canada, with high infection and mortality rates, particularly in long-term care facilities and densely populated neighborhoods. Healthcare systems experienced increased pressure due to hospitalizations and staff shortages during multiple waves of infections.

Public health measures introduced by the Quebec government, including lockdowns, business closures, gathering limits, and curfews, affected daily life and economic activity in Montreal. In January 2021, Quebec implemented a province-wide nighttime curfew, one of the strictest measures in Canada, restricting movement between evening and early morning hours. Schools, gyms, restaurants, and entertainment venues were periodically closed or operated under capacity limits during subsequent waves

The pandemic also had economic consequences, particularly in downtown Montreal, where reduced tourism, remote work, and public health restrictions led to decreased business activity and increased commercial vacancy rates. Some sectors, including retail, hospitality, and tourism, experienced prolonged recovery periods following lockdowns and restrictions.

Vaccination campaigns began in late 2020 and expanded throughout 2021, contributing to a gradual easing of restrictions. However, subsequent waves, including those driven by variants such as Omicron, continued to place pressure on healthcare systems and led to renewed public health measures in late 2021 and early 2022.

By 2022, most restrictions in Montreal were gradually lifted as vaccination rates increased and case numbers stabilized. Despite reopening, public health officials reported that the pandemic had lasting social and economic impacts, particularly among vulnerable populations and communities disproportionately affected by COVID-19.

=== Criminality ===
During the period between the start of the health emergency in Quebec, on March 13, 2020, and May 15, 2020, crimes in Montreal fell by 30% compared to the same period in 2019. In April, a drastic drop of more than two-thirds of reports to the DPJ was observed by the interveners compared to the previous year.

With the suspension of most professional sports leagues, the illegal sports betting network of the Montreal mafia was also undermined. The price of a kilogram of cocaine in Montreal was around $65,000 per kilogram, compared to $43,000 before the pandemic.

On July 18, the date on which wearing a mask in indoor public places became compulsory in Quebec, a man was arrested in a Tim Hortons in Montreal as a result of his refusal to wear a mask. The event was filmed and went viral.

In Old Montreal, residents reported an increase in crime in the absence of tourists. In response, the Old Port of Montreal set a midnight curfew in the area on June 2, 2021.

=== Cultural ===
On March 12, Montreal cancelled the St. Patrick's Day parades for the first time in its 196-year history. The Montreal Symphony Orchestra cancelled concerts scheduled through May 24, including a planned performance at New York City's Carnegie Hall. Various festivals were cancelled, including Les Francos, Montréal Complètement Cirque, and the Montreal International Jazz Festival. Montreal's Just for Laughs comedy festival was postponed to late September and early October. The Montreal Fireworks Festival was also cancelled.

On March 13, the Montreal Museum of Fine Arts (MMFA), the Montreal Museum of Contemporary Art (MAC), and the OPTICA contemporary art centre in Montreal were closed indefinitely, in addition to all national museums in Canada. The next day, the McCord Museum did the same. On April 17, the McCord Museum launched a collaborative photographic project that would use photos to document this period of confinement. On May 5, Montreal museums raised the possibility of reopening by early summer.

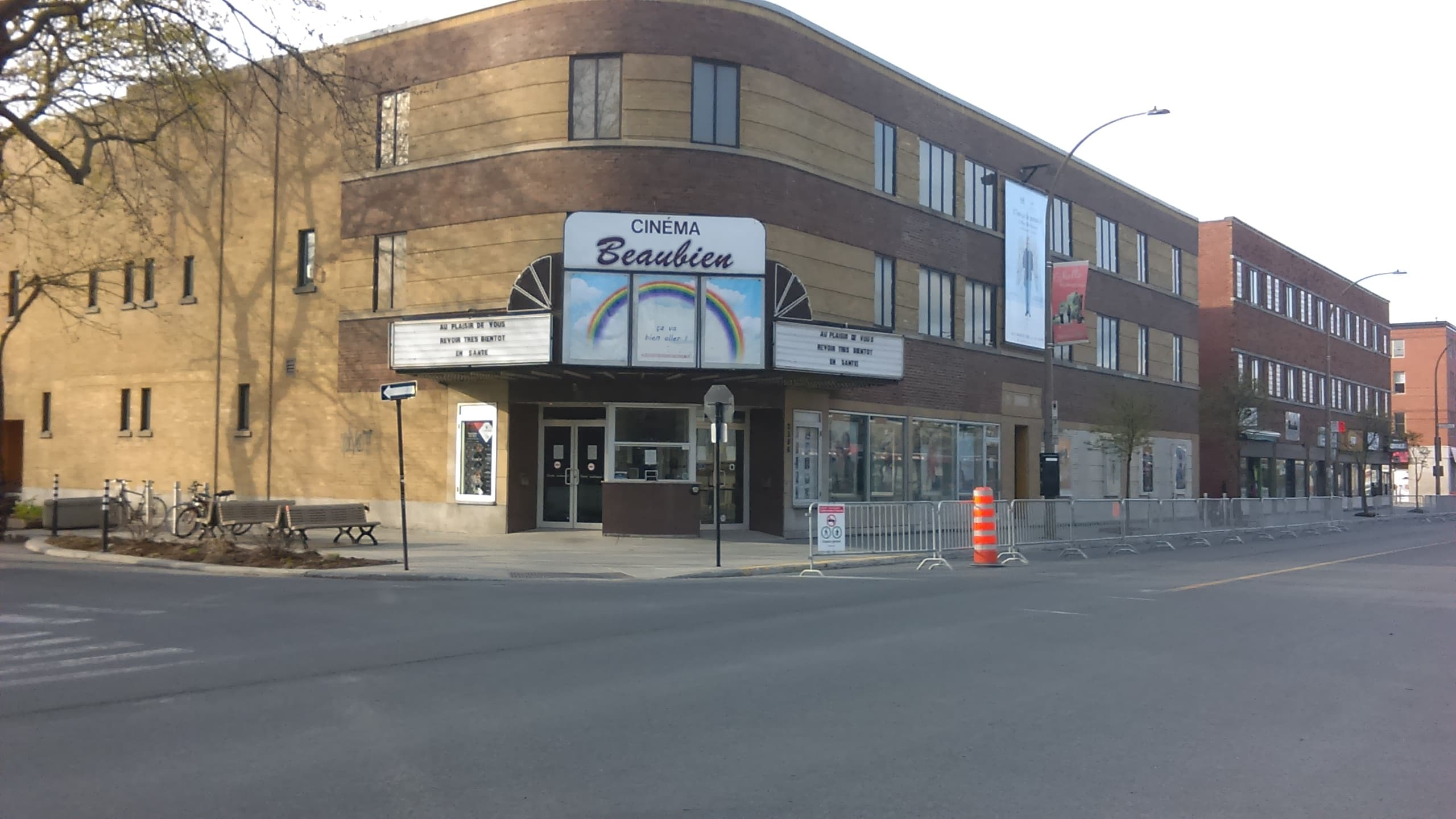
Cinéma Beaubien during mandated 30-day closure during the spring of 2020

On March 14, the Beaubien cinema, the Parc cinema, the Musée cinema, and the Quebec Cinematics, as well as all the museums and all the libraries in the Bibliothèque et Archives Nationales du Québec network closed their doors for 30 days following the request of the Minister of Culture and Communications, Mrs. Nathalie Roy. In addition to these cinemas, the performance halls of the Théâtre de Quat'Sous and the Théâte PAP, the Agora de la danse and the Prospero theater.

As of April 9, several events and shows were cancelled due to COVID-19, including:

Cancelled events, shows and festivals in Montreal
Events	When	Where
FRANCOUVERTES 2020	February 17 – May 4	Lion d'or and Club Soda
Cabane Panache et Bois Rond 2020	March 19 – March 22	Wellington Promenade
Dr. Mobilo Aquafest 2020	May 1 – May 16	Fairmount Theater
Distorsion Psych fest 2020	May 6 – May 9	St-Infant Jesus Church
Festival METRO METRO 2020	May 15 – May 17	Esplanade du Stade Olympique
Pouzza fest 2020	May 15 – May 17	Quartier des spectacles
Festival transamériques FTA 2020	May 20 – June 3	Downtown Montreal

On April 10, following the government's request to suspend events across Quebec until August 31, evenko confirmed that its festivals, notably OSHEAGA, ILESONIQ, and LASSO Montreal would not take place on the scheduled dates, without however officially cancelling said festivals. The Montreal Pride Festival, scheduled from August 6 to 16, was also cancelled.

On May 19, the Montreal Pride announced that a virtual parade would take place from August 10 to 16, 2020. The next day, the Backstreet Boys officially postponed their DNA tour, which was scheduled to stop at the Bell Centre in Montreal on September 16.

On May 22, Minister of Culture Nathalie Roy announced the reopening of museum institutions, cultural product loan counters, and drive-ins on Friday, May 29 throughout Quebec.

On May 29, the Montreal Museum of Fine Arts announced the resumption of its activities as of June 6, 2020.

On June 4, the OSM played for the first time in two months at the Maison Symphonique de Montréal.

On June 9, the Osheaga and ILE SONIQ music festivals, which took place every summer in Montreal, were postponed to 2021.

On June 17, the organizers of the Montreal International Jazz Festival announced that a virtual festival would take place from June 27 to 30.

On June 22, the Opéra de Montréal postponed its Jenufa and La Traviata productions, scheduled for fall 2020, due to COVID-19.

On June 23, the McCord Museum reopened. The next day the MAC reopened, and the Stewart Museum followed suit.

Because of the pandemic, Quebec's national holiday, Saint-Jean-Baptiste, which normally takes place on June 23 in Quebec City and June 24 in Montreal, took place on June 23 in Trois-Rivières.

Starting on July 6, the active and safe routes put in place throughout the city to respond to physical distancing measures were animated through digital works. The city of Montreal provided a budget of $800,000 for this purpose.

=== Economy ===
While the national unemployment rate in April 2020 was 13%, it was estimated to be at 18.2% in the Montreal metropolitan region, up 13.4 percentage points since February. Towards the end of April, Montreal announced a plan to cut its expenditures to fill the deficit of $500 million. The Conference Board suggested that economic activity in the Montreal region would decline by 3.6% in 2020, the result of a fall of 6.6% expected in the second quarter. It was estimated that the Montreal market should lose almost 55,000 jobs in 2020, with an unemployment rate of up to 8.9% (compared to 5.7% last year).

On May 7, Montreal deployed the Fonds de développement de l'économie sociale (FDES) program, which offers grants of up to $50,000 for "startup, growth or consolidation projects."

On May 19, for the first time in almost two and a half months, Montreal gas stations sold a liter of regular fuel at a price greater than $1 per liter.

After a record year in 2019 with a tonnage of goods handled on its quays which exceeded 40 million tonnes, the CEO of the Montreal Port Authority announced on May 19 that she foresaw a 12% drop in traffic in 2020 compared to 2019 due to the pandemic.

On May 21, the city postponed for one month the presentation of its economic recovery plan linked to the COVID-19 crisis. On June 2, Valérie Plante said that the city's economic recovery plan would be unveiled in "the next few weeks".

According to a survey by the Federation of Chambers of Commerce of Quebec, Montreal was the region that was least economically affected by the pandemic in Quebec, with 35.6% of respondents claiming to have experienced a strong financial impact from COVID-19.

On June 2, a committee of experts chaired by the economist Luc Godbout (holder of the chair in taxation and public finance at the Université de Sherbrooke), Richard Sheamur (professor and director of the School of Urban Planning McGill University), and Raquel Fonseca (holder of the Research Chair on Intergenerational Economic Issues at UQAM) presented their report.

On June 3, Mayor Valérie Plante postponed the second payment of property taxes

On June 4, the Minister of Finance announced that the late deconfinement of Montreal would cause Quebec's GDP to drop by almost 6%

On June 5, with the rate reduction mainly affecting Bombardier's mid-range model, the Challenger, assembled in Montreal, the Montreal-based multinational announced the elimination of 2,500 jobs by the end of the year, including 1,500 in Quebec

On June 8, the federal and provincial governments provided $50 million in financial assistance to improve emergency assistance to small and medium-sized businesses in Montreal.

While the Suncor company was suffering a loss of more than $3.5 billion due to the coronavirus pandemic, the company planned to lower its utilization rates in 2020 by almost 10%. In the East Montreal refinery, 137,000 barrels of gasoline and diesel are produced every day.

On June 17, the City of Montreal unveiled its $22 million plan for the economic revival of the metropolis over 6 months.

As of June 18:

- 160,000 jobs were lost in Greater Montreal (−7.1%): Particularly high job losses in sectors where personal contact is more pronounced: accommodation and food services (−24%); education (−23%); information, culture, and leisure (−15%)
- Foreign direct investment (FDI) down 30% to 40% ($2 billion in 2019)
- An 80% shortfall in revenue for the culture and tourism industries for the 2020 summer season.

In his June 19 analysis, Gérard Fillion wrote that "Montreal is in trouble. The city's deficit could be close to $500 million this year, or 9% of the planned budget of $6.2 billion" and that "shops, hotels, restaurants, culture, leisure—these are almost 20% of all the jobs in town."

On June 22, the Montreal company Frank And Oak went into court protection due to the pandemic. Sears, Aldo, Stokes, La Senza, SAIL, and Reitmans had to do the same because of the pandemic.

The closure of the Casino de Montréal, between March 12 and June 25, would have deprived Loto-Québec of approximately $2.5M per day, or $330M in total.

=== Education ===
==== March–April 2020: Suspension of classes ====
On Friday, March 13, the Premier of Quebec, François Legault, announced the closure of schools, CEGEPs, and universities until March 30. On March 22, Quebec extended the school closing period until May 1.

Educational institutions in Montreal
	English Montreal School Board	Commission scolaire de Montréal	Private schools	CEGEP	Universities
Number of schools	64	189	270	12	9
Number of students	35,000	115,018	125,000	54,000	190,000

On April 20, the Minister of Education and Higher Education of Quebec announced that the results of the 2020 winter session would not be counted in the calculation of the R score.

Many experts on May 6 fear a significant increase in high school dropout, which before the pandemic was 15%. On May 12, in a survey commissioned by the Canadian Association of University Teachers (CAUT) and the Canadian Federation of Students (CFS), 77% of Canadian students said they were worried about their future, 70% among them feared not having a job this summer and 30% of them considered leaving their post-secondary studies. On May 15, In a letter sent to Premier Legault, the ministries of health and education, and the mayoress of Montreal, the pediatric association noted a significant delay in the cognitive development of students in Greater Montreal is to be expected because of the prolonged course close.

According to Immigration and Citizenship Canada data, some 30,700 foreign students study in Quebec in 2019. About a third of McGill University students come from abroad and between 8% and 10% of Université de Montréal students. To make up for this possibility of losing a large number of students, the Université de Montréal has already indicated that all of its faculties will hold the fall 2020 session by online classes. On May 14, it was Concordia University's turn to do the same. Two days earlier, the 12 Cégeps de la Métropole had announced similar measures.

==== May–August 2020: Preparation for the start of the school year ====
On May 15, the director of Ahuntsic College estimated that the only way school could return in the fall would be through distance education. Five days later, UQAM announced that its fall 2020 session would be held remotely and online.

On May 26, the Quebec government allowed international students to start their courses this fall even if they are physically abroad. The next day, it asked universities and Cégeps to prepare to welcome 30% of their students in person for the fall of 2020.

On June 1, Daniel Jutras succeeded Guy Breton as rector of UdeM. He delivered a message posted online because of the pandemic.

On July 29, the Public Health Agency of Canada (PHAC) released a guidance document on the COVID-19 pandemic for post-secondary educational institutions.

With 10 days before the start of the school year for CEGEPs in Montreal, the Regroupement des cégeps de Montréal, which brings together 12 French-speaking and English-speaking establishments, could not say the exact percentage of students who will have to set foot in class this fall. For example, 3,500 of the 7,500 students at Collège Ahuntsic will have to show up at one point or another during the week. For its part, the Center de services scolaire de Montréal had 500 teaching positions to fill, including 90 regular positions.

On August 10, Jean-François Roberge, Minister of Education, announced his revised plan for the start of the 2020 school year. In it, we learn that students in the third cycle of elementary school (fifth and sixth grade), as well as all high school students will be required to wear the mask in school, but not in classrooms. A week later, the Minister presented two new advertising campaign measures to help elementary and secondary school students who need support from the start of the school year.

In a letter sent on August 14 to the Minister of Education, the regional director of public health of Montreal and the national director of public health, the Alliance des professeures et professors de Montreal asked Quebec to revise downwards. teacher-student ratios

==== Late August–September 2020: Back to school ====
On August 27, back to school day in Quebec, the Pointe-de-l'Ile school service center in Montreal announced that three staff members from François La-Bernarde, Jules-Verne and Henri-Bourassa had tested positive for COVID-19.

=== Environment ===
==== Air pollution ====
The decrease in air traffic, the closure of factories, the increase in telework, and consequently a significant reduction in road vehicles on the road network, have had the effect of significantly reducing greenhouse gases (GHG). According to data from the Réseau de la surveillance de la qualité de l'air, in the east of the city, the average air quality index was 26.2. For the same period last year, the average was 32.6. Obviously, the better the air quality, the lower the index. This index measures conventional gaseous pollutants (SO_{2}, NO/NO_{2}, O_{3} and H_{2}S), particulate pollution, volatile organic compounds (VOCs) and polycyclic aromatic hydrocarbons (PAHs).

In Montreal, nitrogen dioxide dropped more than 30% during the first two months of the pandemic. Air pollution in Montreal in the spring of 2020 was the lowest since 1997.

==== Biodiversity ====
Like metropolises around the world, more wild animals were seen during the pandemic in Montreal.

On April 3, 2020, the chief scientist of Québec and QuébecOiseaux announced the creation of the Des oiseaux à la Maison. As of May 3, 166 species had been sighted in Montreal.

From May 30, a humpback whale was staying near the Jacques-Cartier Bridge, finding itself more than 400 kilometers (250 miles) from its natural habitat. On May 31, the 3-4 year old calf would have made more than 50 jumps in the old port.

==== Empty cans and bottles ====
Between the end of March and June 22, 2020, Quebec retailers were not obliged to return returnable containers.

===== Selective collection of recyclable materials =====
It was in the 1990s that the selective collective of materials (cardboard, newspapers, paper, glass, plastic and metal) began. According to Statistics Canada, in 2013–2014, Canadians avoided sending over 9 million recycled materials to the landfill. Of this number, more than half went to China. In Quebec, the 27 sorting centres, no longer able to sell our "recyclable" materials, have asked for state aid to survive. In early 2018, the Plante administration injected $29.9 million into the Montreal sorting centre. In January 2020, two of the three sorting centres in Montreal threatened to close, including one that had received the subsidy of nearly 30 million two years earlier.

Garbage and recyclable materials were recognized as an essential service during the pandemic. Although not in the position of the City of Quebec where 80% of the contents of the recycling bins were stored by (and at the costs of the City of Quebec), a large significant quantity of materials normally recycled ended up in the dumps.

As for other materials such as household appliances, refrigerators, wood, sofas, tires, construction residues, dangerous household and green residues, the 7 ecocentres of the agglomeration of Montreal remained open according to the usual schedule, although it was strongly recommended not to go.

===== Plastic bags =====
On February 6, 2020, Mayor Valérie Plante announced the end of plastic bags in all merchants in Montreal by the end of 2020. However, during the crisis, several companies, such as Loblaw or IGA decided to no longer accept reusable bags belonging to customers, the latter having to use plastic bags. As a consequence, packaging manufacturers increased their production by 20%, a phenomenon that was observed across Canada.

=== Health ===
==== Health workers ====
Saturday April 17, a first attendant to the beneficiary fell in coma against COVID-19.

Wednesday, April 29, a beneficiary attendant died after working with patients affected by COVID-19 from CHSLD Cartierville.

Thursday, May 21, a beneficiary attendant who came to lend a hand in CHSLDs died as a result of COVID-19.

On May 13, nearly 20% of the 19,875 COVID-19 positive cases were healthcare workers.

On May 21, a fourth beneficiary attendant in Montreal died as a result of COVID-19.

On May 27, health workers demonstrated in several cities in Quebec, including Montreal, to demand their right to vacation.

In a press conference on June 2, Premier François Legault stated that the majority of the 10,000 beneficiary attendant positions to be filled targeted the Montreal region.

On June 11, a sixth beneficiary attendant died from COVID-19 at the age of 48.

On June 15, a surgeon at the Sacré-Coeur hospital in Montreal was in intensive care because of COVID-19

==== Long-term nursing homes ====
On April 2, 480 cases were detected in Montreal, bringing the total number of confirmed cases to 2,642. Of these, there are 17 deaths. In addition, more than 20 outbreaks have been observed in long-term care facilities.

On May 15, four of the 1,400 soldiers of the Canadian Armed Forces deployed in CHSLDs in Quebec tested positive for COVID-19.

On July 5, the Red Cross began its accelerated training to replace the soldiers in the CHSLDs

==== Medical protective equipment ====
March 20, grocery store workers asked the Quebec government and food banners to strengthen measures to protect them from the virus

On March 24, more and more nurses, some at Maisonneuve-Rosemont Hospital, deemed their equipment inadequate.

On March 25, McGill University donated all of its medical protective equipment to the Government of Quebec. An "obvious" shortage of equipment was observed everywhere in the health network.

On March 26, many health care workers feared they could run out of N95 masks and asked Quebec companies that had them to consider giving them to health professionals.

On March 31, while Quebec was concerned about a potential shortage of protective equipment, the federal government had found more than 175 million surgical masks, some of this equipment came from the Montreal company Medicom.

On April 2, the Department of Health and Social Services began to prepare the transfer of medical equipment from the regions least affected by COVID-19 to the Montreal region.

On April 11, some hospitals in the Montreal region had difficulty finding certain drugs such as acetaminophen or Ativan.

On April 18, employees of two CHSLDs north of Montreal reported that they lacked the necessary protective equipment to carry out their tasks during a pandemic. In the private accommodation centre on boulevard Gouin, there was a shortage of protective gowns. A similar problem had occurred at the CIUSS Centre-Sud in Montreal a few days earlier.

Having been deconfigured since April 20, many Montreal construction contractors, at the beginning of June 2020, had great difficulty in finding protective masks.

==== Mental health ====
On May 22, General Roméo Dallaire launched the "Bâtissons l'espoir" movement with the Douglas Foundation to raise awareness of the mental health issues caused by the COVID-19 crisis.

On May 29, the Montreal Mental Health University Institute launched a weekly survey of hospital staff on the Ethica application to assess their mental health.

On June 5, Laval University published a report reporting that more than 56% of women and 41% of men in the Quebec job market were in psychological distress. A similar study by the Institut de la statistique du Québec published in 2015 indicated that it was 33% for women and 24% for men.

According to a study by the University of Sherbrooke, the levels of depression and anxiety were three times higher than before the pandemic, despite a slight improvement in psychological health since crossing the peak of the first wave of COVID-19, last April.

==== Overwhelmed hospitals ====
On March 20, the EPIC Centre, one of the largest cardiovascular prevention centre in Canada with more than 5,303 registered members, suspended its activities until further notice. As of April 28, four of the five surgical units at Maisonneuve-Rosemont Hospital were infected with COVID-19 patients. On May 7, Le Devoir newspaper revealed that a patient with COVID-19 had been in the emergency room of Maisonneuve-Rosemont hospital for more than 100 hours.

On March 27, while Quebec had 2,021 cases confirmed to COVID-19 and the Jewish General Hospital treated approximately 40% of the 50 intensive care patients, the hospitals of Verdun and Hôpital Notre-Dame did not treat any COVID-19 patient.

As of May 1, thirty patients and 34 health care workers at Lakeshore General Hospital were diagnosed with covid. The hospital was over capacity, so a temporary field hospital was set up in a hockey arena in LaSalle to handle overflow.

On May 6, the National Institute of Excellence in Health and Social Services (INESS) published a study, according to which the room for maneuver for Montreal hospitals would be very slim in the event of an increase in hospitalization related to COVID.

On May 18, Minister of Health and Social Services Danielle McCan announced that non-emergency surgeries postponed due to COVID-19 would gradually resume in Quebec hospitals, but only at a rate of approximately 40% in Greater Montreal, The next day, the Minister raised the possibility of cancer patients in Montreal having surgery outside Montreal, for example, at the Hotel-Dieu de Québec.

However, the Montreal Children's Hospital and CHU Sainte-Justine received slightly less than half of patients during COVID than usual. On June 5, a potential delay of 24,000 oncology surgeries was caused by COVID-19.

=== Justice system ===
==== Detention centres ====
When an individual is sentenced to less than two years in prison, they are sent to a provincial jail. The Montreal region has two detention facilities on its territory.

During a significant outbreak in May 2020, a 70-year-old inmate from Bordeaux Prison with COVID-19 was taken to hospital, where he later died.

In February 2021, the Bordeaux Prison was the site of another major COVID-19 outbreak, which infected 125 inmates and 18 guards. As a result, around half of the prison's 830 inmates were placed in confinement. Advocates deplored the conditions of the inmates, who were kept in their cells for 23 hours a day and who could only shower once a week.

==== Judiciary process ====
It is in Montreal that a first virtual trial took place in Quebec.

On May 28, the Minister of Justice and Attorney General of Quebec, Ms. Sonia LeBel, confirmed that as of June 1, 2020, judicial activities could gradually resume in Quebec courthouses.

On June 5, the City of Montreal announced that the Municipal Court was gradually resuming its activities

==== Trials and COVID-19 ====
Between mid-March and May 31, 2020, only urgent applications were processed by the Criminal Division

On May 19, a request for authorization to bring a class action against 15 universities in Quebec was filed

=== Poverty ===
==== Food insecurity ====
Normally, without the pandemic, one in six people with food insecurity, while 614,000 people were in poverty and exclusion in Greater Montreal. But with the pandemic, in April, Moisson Montréal distributed $7.4 million in foodstuffs, $2.3 million more than in 2019 and the organization had to help 50% more families every day.

The health crisis also deprived the 32,000 children who normally had lunch in one of the Breakfast Club programs. On April 5, the Government of Quebec and the Breakfast Club announced that the funds normally intended for the distribution of breakfasts will be allocated to regional food distribution organizations

On June 5, Moisson Montreal announced that as of May 5, $20M of food had been distributed, which was almost $5M more than last year.

While reported increases of up to 300% in requests for food aid, schools in Montreal have not renewed their program for the 2020–2021 school year.

==== Homeless - Housing ====
On March 19, Lola Rosa restaurants distributed the equivalent of 2,000 meals to several charities.

On March 20, Mayor Plante unveiled an emergency plan for the homeless in the metropolis. The former Royal Victoria Hospital was transformed into an isolation centre for the homeless in order to fight COVID-19. In the meantime, some hotels have welcomed homeless people who have passed a COVID-19 test and are awaiting their results.

Between March 23 and April 20, a temporary COVID-19 screening clinic was set up at Place des Festivals in the Quartier des spectacles in Montreal. This walk-in clinic prioritized health care workers or the homeless

On March 24, La Presse learned that officially, a first homeless person had COVID-19. The latter had resided the day before at the Old Brewery Mission.

On March 28 and 29, at the request of the City of Montreal, the Canadian Red Cross distributed food to the poorest of the Ville-Marie borough.

As of April 6, 46% of homeowners claimed they had not received all of their rents for the month of March 2020, whereas a historic 68% drop in transactions last April was recorded in Montreal.

On April 29, the Trudeau government contributed $21.4 million to its program to fight homelessness. Only $7 million was reserved for the Montreal region, aid deemed far below Montreal's needs. On June 12, the Minister of Health and Social Services announced the addition of $3 million, for a total of $10 million

On March 31, the City of Montreal announced the opening of three day shelters and two additional night shelters would open to accommodate COVID-19 homeless people. Some 1,500 meals a day were distributed in these centres.

Between the beginning and mid-April, the number of homeless people in Montreal with COVID-19 tripled to reach a total of 9 as of April 15. Since mid-April, the City of Montreal and the public health network have opened more than 540 beds in several temporary accommodation centres Which was one of the main reasons why the City declared a local state of emergency. However, a similar number of beds had been removed as a measure of diversion since approximately 50% of the beds in large shelters had to close.

On May 27, Mayor Plante asked Quebec City for emergency assistance of $5 million to help people in need to help out. Earlier that month, the Front d'action populaire en réaménagement urgain (FRAPRU), supported by 25 other community groups, warned that the pandemic could seriously worsen the housing crisis in Montreal.

The number of residential transactions in Greater Montréal decreased by 41% in May compared to the same month in 2019. It was the second consecutive month marked by a significant decrease.

On June 4, when 21 homeless people had received a positive diagnosis from COVID-19 out of the 635 who had been screened, SPVM police proceeded to destroy several makeshift camps erected by homeless people

A total of 20 overdoses have been recorded among hard drug users in Montreal, a peak since the beginning of the year. According to several speakers, this could be linked to the pandemic. According to Accueil Bonneau, many homeless Montrealers with alcohol, drug and mental health problems have relapsed since the pandemic interrupted a large number of resources, such as meetings with Alcoholics Anonymous, were suspended

According to Samuel Watts, President and CEO of Mission Bon Accueil, COVID-19 has had the positive effect of forcing the creation of air-conditioned spaces for the homeless.

As of June 23, at least 126 Montreal families could not find a place to relocate.

=== Racism ===
On January 29, when Canada only had 3 COVID-19 positive cases, the Chinese community denounced the "surge of racist comments" made against their community on social networks in Canada. The remarks were denounced by Prime Minister Justin Trudeau, the mayor of Brossard, Doreen Assad, and Horacio Arruda, director of public health. During the month of February, numerous acts of vandalism targeting pagodas, while Montreal's Chinatown was deserted. Montreal artist Ravy Puth has launched an illustration campaign to denounce racism stemming from the pandemic. On March 15, a Korean researcher was stabbed in Côte-des-Neiges. Whether fuelled by racism or a random act of violence, the stabbing sent a shock wave through the Asian community. On June 3, the Centre for Research-Action on Race Relations (CRARR) published a report documenting incidents of hatred and violence against Montrealers of Asian origin. As of June 11, more than 5,000 people were part of the self-help group against racism against Asians in Quebec. Online survey by Angus Reid Institute in partnership with University of Alberta found that 43% of Canadians of Chinese descent or descent say they have been threatened or intimidated since the start of the COVID pandemic -19.

At the beginning of April, it was the Jewish population of Montreal who felt unfairly laying blame for the spread of the virus on Montreal.

In honor of George Floyd, protests were organized on May 31, June 7 and June 14 in front of the headquarters of the Montreal City Police Service to denounce violence, racism and police impunity. Masks were distributed due to the pandemic.

=== Religious ===
On March 12, the Assembly of Quebec Bishops cancelled all masses during the pandemic. Following this news, the Archbishop of Montreal, Monseigneur Christian Lépine, held masses in camera the following Sunday from the crypt of Saint Joseph's Oratory. However, on March 20, the Archdiocese of Quebec ordered the closure of all churches, chapels of worship and public oratories until further notice.

On March 13, the Canadian Council of Imams asked all 25+ mosques located in the territory of Montreal to suspend services for the duration of the pandemic. On the occasion of Ramadan, the Islamic organization Ahmadiyya Muslim Jama of Montreal offered a "virtual" version of the celebration

On March 18, leaders of the Montreal Hasidic Jewish community decided to close all the synagogues in the territory.

=== Research ===
On March 23, a team at the Montreal Heart Institute led by Jean-Claude Tardif launched a clinical trial exploring the use of colchicine to help treat complications of COVID-19. The first results are expected for the month of June 2020. On April 30, Ontarians Affected by COVID-19 could Now Participate in the Study. The clinical trial was then available in Montreal, New York, New Jersey, Connecticut, California, Madrid-Spain and British Columbia. On May 13, the Bill and Melinda Gates Foundation awarded a $3 million grant to the Montreal Heart Institute for Dr. Tardif's project. A few days later, Dr. Tardif informed the Journal de Montréal that the recruitment of 6,000 patients should be completed in June 2020. On June 30, the Montreal Heart Institute announced that the COLCORONA clinical study will continue to recruit non-hospitalized adult patients with COVID-19.

On March 26, the Fonds de recherche du Québec and Génome Québec established a provincial task force to build a biobank of COVID-19 samples (BQC19), led by McGill University chair Vincent Mooser. By May 5, 494 patients had been recruited. On May 24, it was a dozen hospitals that had recruited more than 1,000 patients. On June 22, Marc Parent, President and CEO of CAE made a personal donation of $100,000 to the Foundation of the McGill University Health Center to support research related to the Quebec Biobank of COVID-19.

Mila, an artificial intelligence institute in Montreal, is developing contact tracing software for mobile phones. Federal government invests $40 million on April 23. The application, which is called COVI, was launched on May 18, 2020. Louise Arbour and Louise Otis, two ex-judges joined the project a few days later. However, on June 10, Le Devoir reported that it would seem that it was Shopify, who developed a digital tracking tool called Covid Shield, that the Trudeau government would prefer.

On April 14, the McConnel Chair in Research-Creation on the reappropriation of maternity at the Université de Montréal launched a participatory and collective work project called Pregnancy in confinement. The project aimed to collect works (drawings, sketches, paintings, collage) of pregnant women or women who have recently given birth so that they can express their state of mind.

On May 1, a new statistical technique developed by economists at the University of Montreal demonstrated that Quebec had 12 times more COVID-19 cases at the time than the number reported.

On May 6, the Research Institute of the McGill University Health Centre (RI-MUHC) conducted the first evaluation of a robot that disinfects using ultraviolet light in Canada.

On May 7, a group of Canadian and American researchers was conducting research to try to determine where and when the next pandemic would occur. The study was led by Timothée Poisot, professor in the Department of Biological Sciences at the University of Montreal.

Starting in June, the Ad5-nCoV vaccine, developed by the Chinese company CanSino Biologics (Tianjin, China) and the Beijing Institute of Biotechnology (Beijing, China) will be manufactured in Montreal and tested in Canada. The vaccine was tested between March 16 and March 27, 2020, in Wuhan. The Lancet magazine reported on May 22 that it was the first COVID-19 vaccine to successfully complete Phase 1.

On May 20, the Vaccine Study Centre of the McGill University Health Centre began recruiting participants to test potential vaccines against COVID-19.

On May 15, the first transfusion of convalescent plasma to a patient with COVID-19 in Canada took place Thursday at CHU Sainte-Justine. Scientists from CHU Sainte-Justine, the Research Centre, the University of Montreal Hospital Centre, the Jewish General Hospital, Héma-Québec and several other hospitals in the province participated in this project. The patient was then released from intensive care. As WHO suspended clinical trials of hydroxychloroquine following the publication of an article in The Lancet, Le Devoir reported that Dr. McDonald, director of the Clinical Practice Assessment Unit of the McGill University Health Centre (MUHC), continued its clinical trial of hydroxychloroquine

On June 1, a project led by professors Michael Tyers (IRIC University of Montreal), Yoshua Bengio (Mila / University of Montréa) and Anne Marinier (IRIC / University of Montreal) was launched. This project, funded to the tune of one million dollars by Génome Québec, is a mixture of artificial intelligence, genomics and medicinal chemistry

On June 3, a team of researchers from UQAM had recruited 2,000 participants for a study on the psychological impact of COVID-19.

On July 3, a team of researchers from the University of Quebec in Montreal and Manitoba received funding of $622,782 from the Canadian Institutes of Health Research (CIHR) to develop a nanovaccine against the SARS-CoV-2 virus.

=== Sports ===
The National Hockey League and Major League Soccer have suspended their regular seasons, affecting the Montreal Canadiens and Montreal Impact. With Major League Baseball suspending preseason play, the Toronto Blue Jays' annual preseason series at Olympic Stadium was also cancelled. The 2020 World Figure Skating Championships being hosted by Montreal were cancelled on March 11.

On April 7, Formula One postponed the Canadian Grand Prix. Four days later, Tennis Canada announced that pursuant to the request by the provincial government, the women's portion of the Canadian Open was cancelled. Montreal is now scheduled to host the 2021 women's tournament instead. The women's and men's competitions normally alternate between Montreal and Toronto.

On April 15, in a press release from the organization of the Grands Prix Cyclistes de Montréal (GPCQM) and the Union Cycliste Internationale (UCI), the stages in Montreal and Quebec, the only UCI WorldTour races presented in America, retain their place on the 2020 calendar. In a press release dated July 2, the organizers of the Grands Prix cyclistes de Québec and de Montréal announced that they were continuing their preparation for the two races scheduled for September 11 and 13. However, both courses were canceled on July 23.

Other provincial sports bodies have also suspended activities, including Basketball Québec, Baseball Québec (baseball activity suspended until at least May 1), Hockey Québec (including the Quebec Junior Hockey League, which called off the remainder of the season), and Soccer Québec (activity suspended until at least May 1). Other local events that have faced cancellations include the Tour de l'Île de Montréal, and various footraces.

On May 6, when MLS leaders gave circuit teams permission to hold individual fitness sessions on the field, the Montreal Impact players still have not received city approvals. The Montreal Regional Department of Public Health refused the request the next day, while the city of Toronto said yes to the Toronto FC.

On May 7, Randy Ambrosie, the commissioner of the Canadian Football League (CFL) told the House of Commons that the most likely scenario was to cancel the 2020 season, which include the Montreal Alouettes. In the meantime, the Alouettes' cheerleaders have given free performances outside some CHSLDs affected by the virus. On May 20, the CFL announced the postponement of the start of its 2020 season to September 1

On May 13, Isabelle Charest, the Minister for Sports and Recreation of Quebec announced that from May 20, golf, singles tennis, fishing, rowing, cycling, sailing, swimming in open water, athletics, can be practiced anywhere in Quebec, including in Montreal.

On May 15, Montreal Canadiens goalkeeper Carey Price and his wife provided meals to 160 workers in the maternity department and the neonatal intensive care unit at the Jewish General Hospital and 1,200 health workers. The couple had already donated $50,000 to the Breakfast Club of Canada Emergency Fund. In addition to Price, Philip Danault, Jeff Petry, Brendan Gallagher and Nick Suzuki have also made various donations.

At the end of May, the players of the National Hockey League accepted the scenario, proposed unanimously by the governors of the Betmann circuit, 29–2.

On June 2, Formula 1 released its modified 2020 calendar, and that of Montreal was still not canceled.

On June 8, the Montreal Impact held its first training in small groups. Two days later, Commissioner Garber announced that the 25th season of MLS would restart July 8 in Orlando

On June 8, U SPORTS, the governing body for university sport in Canada, announced the cancellation of its six national championships in the fall of 2020, including the Vanier Cup.

On June 22, the Montreal Carabins football team resumed collective practices.

On June 24, MLS announced the schedule for its MLS is Back tournament, which included a return to play for the Montreal Impact on July 9 in Orlando against the New England Revolution.

On June 26, World Triathlon rescheduled the Montreal stage of the World Triathlon and Paratriathlon Series, postponed because of the pandemic, to October 3 and 4, at Parc Jean-Drapeau.

On July 3, the Montreal Impact admitted to restructuring caused by the pandemic.

On July 23, defenseman Xavier Ouellet of the Montreal Canadiens announced that he had received a positive result for COVID-19 before the start of training camp. A few days later, it was Brett Kulak's turn to admit having tested positive for COVID-19 in early July.

On July 24, François Dumontier, President and CEO of the 2020 Grand Prix du Canada race in Montreal announced that the race will not finally take place.

On July 30, the organizers of the Montreal Marathon announced the cancellation of the 2020 edition due to the COVID-19 pandemic. The event was supposed to take place on September 19 and 20, 2020.

On August 17, the commissioner of the CFL, Randy Ambrosie, announced the cancellation of the 2020 season due to the COVID-19 pandemic.

On April 28, 2021, the Canadian Grand Prix was cancelled for a second year in a row due to the pandemic.

=== Tourism ===
In 2019, Montreal received more than 11 million visitors a year and nearly $5 billion in revenue. The Old Port alone attracts nearly 7 million tourists a year

On April 9, the organization Tourisme Montréal foresaw an 80% loss of revenue for the summer season, while half of the hotel establishments had already suspended their operations. In 2019, Montreal welcomed 11 million tourists, more than 3 million from outside Canada, generating revenue of $4.85 billion.

As of April 26, of the 140 business conferences scheduled in the metropolitan area until mid-June, almost 50 had been postponed and 70 were cancelled. According to Tourisme Montréal, the events postponed until that date represented direct expenses of $55 million, including 70,000 nights reserved at the hotel.

For the month of April, the occupancy rate of hotels in Montreal fell from 70% to only 3%.

On May 19, Tourisme Montréal and Ig2 invited Montrealers to rediscover their city with the #MTLmoments challenge.

On May 22, the organizers of Movin'On, the World Summit on Sustainable Mobility, announced that it would return to Montreal in 2021. The 2020 edition was canceled due to the pandemic.

On June 2, Yves Lalumière, President and CEO of Tourisme Montréal stated that nearly 10 million fewer visitors will be in Montreal during the summer because of the health measures decreed to halt the spread of COVID-19.

On June 12, one day after Quebec announced $750 million in assistanceto revive the tourism industry, the Greater Montreal Hotel Association maintained that the proposals did not take into account the gravity of the impact of the pandemic on the Montreal region

Without making any official forecasts, the Greater Montreal Hotel Association forecast occupancy rates ranging from 10% to 15% for the months of July and August. By comparison, last year, for the same periods, we expected rates of 83.5% and 87.8%.

From August 1 to 8, 2020, the city of Montreal was to host the World Esperanto Congress, but it was postponed to 2022 due to the COVID-19 pandemic.

On August 14, Claudia Morisette, director of Notre-Dame Basilica estimated the loss of income caused by the COVID-19 pandemic at $12 million.

=== Transport ===
On March 4, the Société des transports de Montréal (STM) adopted new hygiene measures to counter the spread of the coronavirus in its facilities.

On March 12, when the City of Montreal closed its public places, the STM kept its metro and bus networks open. In addition to the increased cleaning, individual disinfectant solutions for employees in contact with the public were provided. The next day, the transportation company prohibited all of its employees from traveling outside Quebec.

On March 16, the Minister of Transport announced that air carriers would refuse to board any passenger who was not a citizen or permanent resident of Canada from March 18 on flights to Canada. For other passengers, Pierre Elliot Trudeau International Airport was designated by the federal government as one of the four airports in Canada to remain open for international flights.

From March 17, the Société de transport de Montréal decided to no longer control the tickets of users who use the buses. Then, as of March 24, the STM no longer accepted cash. According to figures from the transportation agency, there was a 75% decrease in daily bus trips. And in the metro, we're talking about an 80% decrease. As of May 5, the decline in ridership exceeded 80%

On March 23, the first STM employee tested positive for COVID-19. By April 15, it was 34 employees with COVID-19, including 14 bus drivers. An officer from the Montreal police service (SPVM) was also admitted to intensive care. The man was in his late thirties and was assigned to the Montreal metro.

On March 25, users of public transportation in Greater Montreal who purchased an annual pass were reimbursed for the payment of April. Two days later, transportation companies in Greater Montreal reduced their services because of the coronavirus lockdown

On April 7, the STM announced the suspension of non-essential activities in metro stations. Among these measures, the solicitation and distribution in person of free printed material was no longer permitted. Therefore, the magazine L'Itinéraire could no longer be distributed.

On April 10, the union of bus drivers of the Société de transport de Montréal asked that public transit users wear the mask.

The 2020 season for BIXI bikes began as scheduled on April 15. In addition, additional instructions regarding hygiene measures were strongly recommended. The service offered as of April 15, 2020 includes: 7,270 regular bikes, 160 electric bikes, 610 stations spread over 142 square kilometers (55 sq. mi.). Unlike in previous years, no advertising was displayed on the rear wheel.

On April 11, figures from the Regional Metropolitan Transport Authority (ARMT) predicted that customer traffic declines in recent weeks, due to general confinement, could cause a loss of $ 75M for the month of April

On April 28, the STM announced that it would acquire and distribute artisanal masks for its employees

On May 27, some 425 Montreal taxis were fitted with protective partitions. By the end of June 2020, some 900 taxis in the metropolis should be equipped in this way. It was also on May 27 that the Montreal Ombusdman, Johanne Savard, sent the city a recommendation to pay attention to the most vulnerable during urban redevelopment. This plan, announced a few days earlier, provided for more than 327 additional kilometers (200 miles) for pedestrians and cyclists.

On May 29, Transport Minister Marc Garneau confirmed that international cruises will be banned in Canada. This measure could lose a billion dollars in economic spinoffs in Quebec.

The Montreal metro, which experienced declines in ridership exceeding 90% in March and April, reported an 86% decrease in ridership in early June.

On June 3, the President of the Treasury Board, Christian Dubé, introduced Bill 61 to stimulate the Quebec economy. Once adopted, this law would allow the STM to be able to expropriate without going through the courts or requesting the opinion of Québec throughout its territory. The purpose of this measure is to facilitate the extension of the blue line in eastern Montreal.

On June 4, Radio-Canada revealed that at least two taxi drivers serving Montréal-Trudeau airport had died from COVID-19.

From June 4 at noon, personnel aboard aircraft must wear a non-medical mask. Passengers had to comply with this obligation since April 17.

On June 18, the Metropolitan Regional Transport Authority forecast losses of $523 million for the industry. A loss that could continue next year.

On June 19, the president and chief executive officer of Aéroports de Montréal (ADM), Philippe Rainville, in an open letter distributed to the media, asked the governments of Quebec and Ottawa to grant "a loan with flexible repayment terms in based on restoring revenues "so that the Metropolitan Express Network (REM) project, valued at $ 250 million, can move forward. With air traffic falling by 97% due to the pandemic, ADM predicted a 60% drop in revenues for 2020.

From June 22, the wearing of face covers will be imposed on travelers and employees at Pierre-Eliot Trudeau Airport. From June 23, it was the turn of VIA Rail passengers to be forced to wear the mask.

On June 26, the ARTM announced the gradual lifting of the COVID-19 lockdown measures and a return to normal fare collection on buses.

On June 29, Dr. Arruda announced that the Quebec government would announce the following day the mandatory wearing of masks for public transport users.

On June 30, Premier Legault confirmed that the mask will be mandatory for passengers 12 years and older from Monday, July 13.

On July 9, the Quebec government announced emergency assistance of $ 8.2 million for interurban transportation. The bus service between Montreal and Quebec could resume the next day. This trip was canceled due to the pandemic.

Since July 13, seven hawkers from the Metro newspaper have been distributing masks to STM users.

Starting July 27, STM users may be denied access to those who do not want to wear a mask. Several altercations were caused by users refusing to submit to the compulsory wearing of a masks.

== Distribution of deaths by living environment in the region of Montreal ==
=== May 2020 ===
Distribution of deaths by living environment in the sociosanitary region of Montréal.
Date	Hospital Centre	Long-term care centre	Home	Intermediate resource	Private seniors' residence	Other	Unknown	Total
May 2	97	947	117	19	143	11	31	1,365
May 3	96	979	119	21	157	11	27	1,410
May 4	106	1,038	124	21	166	11	22	1,489
May 5	111	1,088	131	21	178	11	22	1,562
May 6	112	1,173	134	22	189	12	24	1,666
May 7	116	1,215	138	24	197	15	22	1,727
May 8	127	1,245	142	26	201	15	4	1,760
May 9	135	1,320	148	26	214	16	4	1,863
May 10	143	1,354	151	28	222	15	5	1,919
May 11	156	1,404	154	29	238	16	6	2,003
May 12	157	1,454	158	29	241	18	6	2,063
May 13	161	1,523	162	29	254	18	7	2,154
May 14	162	1,542	164	29	257	20	8	2,182
May 15	163	1,576	166	30	271	20	8	2,234
May 16	170	1,602	167	33	277	20	7	2,276
May 17	170	1,612	172	34	279	22	7	2,296
May 18	166	1,631	179	35	279	26	7	2,323
May 19	169	1,666	181	36	282	26	7	2,367
May 20	171	1,702	184	37	284	26	7	2,411
May 21	172	1,732	188	38	290	27	7	2,454
May 22	141	1,784	193	45	313	27	5	2,508
May 23	143	1,800	197	45	321	27	5	2,538
May 24	145	1,813	199	45	324	27	5	2,558
May 25	145	1,832	203	45	327	27	5	2,584
May 26	147	1,855	208	46	336	27	5	2,624
May 27	150	1,888	210	46	340	27	5	2,666
May 28	155	1,896	213	55	343	23	5	2,690
May 29	155	1,929	220	56	352	23	5	2,740
May 30	163	2,042	227	63	391	27	6	2,919
May 31	163	2,047	228	63	393	27	6	2,927

=== June 2020 ===
Distribution of deaths by living environment in the sociosanitary region of Montréal.
Date	Hospital Centre	Long-term care centre	Home	Intermediate resource	Private seniors' residence	Other	Unknown	Total (N)	Total (%)
June 1	163	2,060	233	65	393	27	6	2,947	62.5%
June 2	164	2,089	236	65	396	26	6	2,982	62.2%
June 3	166	2,117	236	65	400	26	6	3,016	61.7%
June 4	167	2,132	240	67	409	26	6	3,047	61.7%
June 5	168	2,144	241	67	411	26	5	3,062	61.6%
June 6	169	2,148	241	67	411	26	5	3,067	61.6%
June 7	169	2,148	241	67	412	26	5	3,068	61.6%
June 8	170	2,160	244	67	416	26	5	3,068	61.4%
June 9	169	2,178	245	65	426	29	5	3,117	61.3%
June 10	167	2,189	247	65	428	29	5	3,130	61.3%
June 11	168	2,209	250	65	430	30	6	3,158	61.3%
June 12	171	2,225	253	69	435	30	6	3,189	61.4%
June 14	172	2,233	255	69	439	30	7	3,205	61.1%
June 15	172	2,238	258	69	442	30	7	3,216	61.0%
June 16	173	2,254	258	69	447	30	7	3,238	61.1%
June 17	174	2,277	256	70	453	30	7	3,267	61.2%
June 18	176	2,299	254	71	460	31	7	3,298	61.4%
June 19	177	2,317	254	72	459	35	7	3,321	61.4%
June 20	177	2,322	257	72	459	35	7	3,329	61.5%
June 21	177	2,322	257	72	459	35	7	3,329	61.5%
June 22	178	2,323	257	74	457	35	7	3,331	61.4%
June 24	180	2,328	258	75	459	35	7	3,342	61.3%
June 25	NA	NA	NA	NA	NA	NA	NA	NA	NA
June 26	NA	NA	NA	NA	NA	NA	NA	NA	NA
June 27	NA	NA	NA	NA	NA	NA	NA	NA	NA
June 28	181	2,348	259	75	456	35	7	3,361	61.3%
June 29	184	2,357	261	76	456	35	7	3,376	61.3%
June 30	185	2,365	265	77	458	34	8	3,392	61.4%

=== July 2020 ===
Distribution of deaths by living environment in the sociosanitary region of Montréal
Date	Hospital Centre	Long-term care centre	Home	Intermediate resource	Private seniors' residence	Other	Unknown	Total (N)	Total (%)
July 1	183 (-2)	2,370 (+5)	266 (+1)	77 (0)	458 (0)	34 (0)	8 (0)	3,396 (+4)	61.3%
July 2	184 (+1)	2,383 (+13)	267 (+1)	78 (+1)	452 (-6)	34 (0)	8 (0)	3,406 (+10)	61.3%
July 3	184 (0)	2,383 (0)	267 (0)	78 (0)	452 (0)	34 (0)	8 (0)	3,406 (0)	61.2%
July 4	184 (0)	2,384 (+1)	267 (0)	78 (0)	453 (+1)	34 (0)	8 (0)	3,408 (+2)	61.1%
July 5	184 (0)	2,384 (0)	267 (0)	78 (0)	453 (0)	34 (0)	8 (0)	3,408 (0)	61.1%
July 6	183 (-1)	2,396 (+12)	267 (0)	81 (+3)	446 (-7)	33 (-1)	7 (-1)	3,413 (+5)	61.1%
July 7	183 (0)	2,397 (+1)	267 (0)	81 (0)	447 (1)	33 (0)	7 (0)	3,415 (+2)	60.9%
July 8	183 (0)	2,400 (+3)	267 (0)	81 (0)	447 (0)	33 (0)	7 (0)	3,418 (+3)	60.9%
July 9	183 (0)	2,400 (0)	267 (0)	81 (0)	447 (0)	33 (0)	7 (0)	3,418 (0)	60.9%
July 10	180 (-3)	2,414 (+14)	266 (-1)	81 (0)	439 (-8)	33 (0)	7 (0)	3,420 (+2)	60.9%
July 11	180 (0)	2,416 (+2)	266 (0)	81 (0)	440 (+1)	33 (0)	7 (0)	3,423 (+3)	60.8%
July 12	180 (0)	2,416 (0)	267 (+1)	81 (0)	440 (0)	33 (0)	7 (0)	3,424 (+1)	60.8%
July 14	180	2,437	269	80	421	33	7	3,427	60.8%
July 15	180 (0)	2,441 (+4)	269 (0)	80 (0)	421 (0)	33 (0)	7 (0)	3,431 (+4)	60.8%
July 16	180 (0)	2,441 (0)	269 (0)	80 (0)	421 (0)	33 (0)	7 (0)	3,431 (0)	60.8%
July 17	180 (0)	2,441 (0)	270 (+1)	80 (0)	422 (+1)	33 (0)	8 (+1)	3,434 (+3)	60.7%
July 18	180 (0)	2,441 (0)	270 (0)	80 (0)	422 (0)	33 (0)	8 (0)	3,434 (0)	60.7%
July 19	180 (0)	2,441 (0)	270 (0)	80 (0)	422 (0)	33 (0)	8 (0)	3,434 (0)	60.7%
July 20	180 (0)	2,441 (0)	270 (0)	80 (0)	422 (0)	33 (0)	8 (0)	3,434 (0)	60.7
July 21	180 (0)	2,441 (0)	270 (0)	80 (0)	422 (0)	33 (0)	8 (0)	3,434 (0)	60.7%
July 22	180 (0)	2,441 (0)	270 (0)	80 (0)	422 (0)	33 (0)	8 (0)	3,434 (0)	60.6%
July 23	180 (0)	2,441 (0)	270 (0)	80 (0)	422 (0)	33 (0)	8 (0)	3,434 (0)	60.6%
July 24	180 (0)	2,441 (0)	270 (0)	80 (0)	422 (0)	33 (0)	8 (0)	3,434 (0)	60.6%
July 25	180 (0)	2,441 (0)	270 (0)	80 (0)	422 (0)	33 (0)	8 (0)	3,434 (0)	60.6%
July 25	180 (0)	2,441 (0)	270 (0)	80 (0)	422 (0)	33 (0)	8 (0)	3,434 (0)	60.6%
July 26	180 (0)	2,441 (0)	270 (0)	80 (0)	422 (0)	33 (0)	8 (0)	3,434 (0)	60.6%
July 27	180 (0)	2,441 (0)	270 (0)	80 (0)	422 (0)	33 (0)	8 (0)	3,434 (0)	60.6%
July 28	180 (0)	2,441 (0)	270 (0)	80 (0)	422 (0)	33 (0)	8 (0)	3,434 (0)	60.6%
July 29	180 (0)	2,441 (0)	270 (0)	80 (0)	422 (0)	33 (0)	8 (0)	3,434 (0)	60.6%
July 30	180 (0)	2,441 (0)	270 (0)	80 (0)	422 (0)	33 (0)	11 (+3)	3,437 (+3)	60.6%
July 31	180 (0)	2,441 (0)	270 (0)	80 (0)	422 (0)	33 (0)	15 (+4)	3,441 (+4)	60.6%

=== August 2020 ===
Distribution of deaths by living environment in the sociosanitary region of Montréal
Date	Hospital Centre	Long-term care centre	Home	Intermediate resource	Private seniors' residence	Other	Unknown	Total (N)	Total (%)
August 1	180 (0)	2,441 (0)	270 (0)	80 (0)	422 (0)	33 (0)	17 (+2)	3,443 (+2)	60.6%
August 2	180 (0)	2,441 (0)	270 (0)	80 (0)	422 (0)	33 (0)	18 (+1)	3,444 (+1)	60.6%
August 3	180 (0)	2,441 (0)	270 (0)	80 (0)	422 (0)	33 (0)	19 (+1)	3,445 (+1)	60.6%
August 4	180 (0)	2,441 (0)	270 (0)	80 (0)	422 (0)	33 (0)	21 (+2)	3,447 (+2)	60.6%
August 5	180 (0)	2,441 (0)	270 (0)	80 (0)	422 (0)	33 (0)	21 (0)	3,447 (0)	60.6%
August 6	180 (0)	2,441 (0)	270 (0)	80 (0)	422 (0)	33 (0)	24 (+3)	3,450 (+3)	60.6%
August 7	180 (0)	2,441 (0)	270 (0)	80 (0)	422 (0)	33 (0)	26 (+2)	3,452 (+2)	60.6%
August 8	184 (+4)	2,431 (-10)	294 (+14)	83 (+3)	424 (+2)	34 (+1)	0 (-26)	3,450 (-2)	60.6%
August 9	184 (0)	2,431 (0)	294 (0)	83 (0)	424 (0)	34 (0)	0	3,450 (0)	60.6%
August 10	184 (0)	2,432 (+1)	294 (0)	83 (0)	435 (+11)	34 (0)	0	3,462 (+12)	60.6%
August 11	184 (0)	2,433 (+1)	294 (0)	83 (0)	435 (0)	34 (0)	0	3,463 (+1)	60.6%
August 12	184 (0)	2,433 (0)	294 (0)	83 (0)	435 (0)	34 (0)	0	3,463 (0)	60.6%
August 13	184 (0)	2,432 (-1)	294 (0)	83 (0)	435 (0)	34 (0)	0	3,462 (-1)	60.5%
August 14	184 (0)	2,432 (0)	294 (0)	83 (0)	435 (0)	34 (0)	0	3,462 (0)	60.5%
August 15	184 (0)	2,432 (0)	294 (0)	83 (0)	435 (0)	34 (0)	0	3,462 (0)	60.5%
August 16	184 (0)	2,432 (0)	294 (0)	83 (0)	435 (0)	34 (0)	0	3,462 (0)	60.5%
August 17	184 (0)	2,432 (0)	294 (0)	83 (0)	435 (0)	34 (0)	0	3,462 (0)	60.5%
August 18	184 (0)	2,432 (0)	295 (+1)	83 (0)	436 (+1)	34 (0)	0	3,464 (+2)	60.5%
August 19	184 (0)	2,432 (0)	296 (+1)	83 (0)	436 (0)	34 (0)	0	3,465 (+1)	60.4%
August 20	183 (-1)	2,430 (-2)	296 (0)	102 (+19)	421 (-15)	34 (0)	0	3,466 (+1)	60.4%
August 21	183 (0)	2,430 (0)	296 (0)	102 (0)	421 (0)	34 (0)	0	3,466 (0)	60.4%
August 22	183 (0)	2,430 (0)	296 (0)	102 (0)	421 (0)	34 (0)	0	3,466 (0)	60.3%
August 23	183 (0)	2,430 (0)	296 (0)	102 (0)	420 (-1)	34 (0)	0	3,465 (-1)	60.3%
August 24	183 (0)	2,430 (0)	296 (0)	102 (0)	420 (0)	34 (0)	0	3,465 (0)	60.3%
August 25	183 (0)	2,430 (0)	297 (+1)	102 (0)	421 (+1)	34 (0)	0	3,467 (+2)	60.3%
August 29	183 (0)	2,432 (+2)	297 (0)	102 (0)	420 (-1)	35 (+1)	0	3,469 (+2)	60.2%
August 30	183 (0)	2,432 (0)	297 (0)	102 (0)	420 (0)	35 (0)	0	3,469 (0)	60.2%
