= Jean-Claude Tardif =

Canadian cardiologist

Jean-Claude Tardif (born in 1964) is the Director of the Research Center at the Montreal Heart Institute and Professor of Medicine at the University of Montreal. He received his medical degree (MD) in 1987 from the University of Montreal and specialized in cardiology and research in Montreal and Boston until 1994. Dr. Tardif holds the Canada Research Chair in personalized medicine and the University of Montreal endowed research chair in atherosclerosis. He is also the Scientific Director of Seriant (previously the Montreal Health Innovations Coordinating Center (MHICC)).

His research covers the molecular and genomic aspects of atherosclerosis and related diseases and also involves animal models, mechanistic and observational clinical studies as well as early clinical trials and large international randomized clinical trials. Dr. Tardif is or has been the international principal investigator or part of the study leadership of several large clinical trials in the field of atherosclerosis and other cardiovascular diseases. Dr. Tardif and his team have created the Beaulieu-Saucier Pharmacogenomics Center at the Montreal Heart Institute and he has created the Center of Excellence in Personalized Medicine, the latter funded by the Network of Centers of Excellence of Canada and which has also been supported by multiple pharmaceutical and biotechnological companies.

Dr. Tardif has authored more than 750 scientific articles and has won multiple awards, including the Research Achievement Award of the Canadian Cardiovascular Society, the Distinguished Lecturer Award of the Canadian Institutes for Health Research, the Genesis Award of BIOQuébec (for his outstanding contributions to life sciences), the Armand-Frappier Award of the Government of Québec (the highest scientific honour) and the Margolese National Heart Disorders Prize (for his outstanding contributions to the treatment, amelioration, or cure of heart disorders). Because of his accomplishments, Dr. Tardif was named Fellow of the Canadian Academy of Health Sciences and Fellow of the Royal Society of Canada and was inducted in the Order of Canada (the highest distinction in the country).

== Early life ==
Jean-Claude Tardif was born in Laval, Quebec, Canada in 1964. He attended the University of Montreal where he received his MD degree in 1987. Tardif completed his residency at Maisonneuve-Rosemont and Notre-Dame hospitals in Montreal, Canada in 1990. Subsequently, he completed his cardiology fellowship at Sacré-Coeur Hospital and at the Montreal Heart Institute and then his research fellowship at the New England Medical Center of Tufts University School of Medicine in Boston, Massachusetts.

== Career ==
In his work as a clinical trialist, Tardif has designed, conducted, and served as Principal Investigator for trials like COLCOT, Dal-Gene, INITIATIVE and SPIRE. His work contributed to the approval of low-dose colchicine by Health Canada for the prevention of atherothrombotic events in patients with coronary artery disease and its entry into the European guidelines and South American guidelines for cardiovascular prevention.

== Academic appointments ==
- 1987-1988, Assistant chief resident, Hôpital Maisonneuve-Rosemont, Montreal, Canada
- 1991, Chief resident, Montreal Heart Institute, Montreal, Canada
- 1991-1992, Resident representative, Cardiology University Department, Université de Montréal
- 1992-1924, Instructor of Medicine, Tufts University School of Medicine, New England Medical Center, Boston, Massachusetts
- 1994–present, Cardiologist, Montreal Heart Institute, Montreal, Canada
- 1994–present, Director, Intravascular Ultrasound Core Laboratory, Montreal Heart Institute, Montreal, Canada
- 1994-1999, Assistant Professor of Medicine, Montreal Heart Institute, Université de Montréal, Montreal, Canada
- 1999-2006, Associate Professor of Medicine, Montreal Heart Institute, Université de Montréal, Montreal, Canada
- 1999-2004, Director of Clinical Research, Research Center, Montreal Heart Institute, Montreal, Canada
- 2003–present, Director, Research Chair, Pfizer Endowed Research Chair in Atherosclerosis, Université de Montréal, Montreal, Canada
- 2004–present, Director, Research Center, Montreal Heart Institute, Montreal, Canada
- 2005-2009, Director, Quebec Cardiovascular Health Network (RSCV), Quebec Health Research Fund (FRSQ)
- 2006–present, Professor of Medicine, Montreal Heart Institute, Université de Montréal, Montreal, Canada
- 2012-2025, Director, Research Chair, Canada Research Chair in Translational and Personalized Medicine

== Honors and awards ==
- 1980, Best High School graduate award, College Laval
- 1982-1983, University scholarship, Université de Montréal
- 1987, Rodolphe Boulet-Sandoz award of excellence in medicine at graduation
- 1987, Ciba-Geigy award of excellence in clinical medicine at medical graduation
- 1989, Merck award of excellence in clinical research, Quebec internist meeting
- 1991, Wyeth award of excellence in cardiology, Université de Montreal
- 1992-1924, McLaughlin Foundation of Canada, Grant for research fellowship
- 1998, First Martial Bourassa Award for excellence in research, Montreal Heart Institute
- 1999, Carsley Foundation Award for excellence in research, Montreal Heart Inst.
- 2003-2007, Canadian Institutes of Health Research and Pfizer Research chair in atherosclerosis
- 2004, Quebec Society of Lipidology, Nutrition and Metabolism, Founders' Award
- 2004, Montreal La Presse, Personality of the week
- 2007, Fellow, Canadian Academy of Health Sciences
- 2008, Canadian Cardiovascular Society, Research Achievement Award
- 2008, Montreal La Presse, Personality of the week
- 2008, Montreal La Presse, Personality of the year
- 2011, Bio-Quebec Genesis Brio Award
- 2011, Armand-Frappier Award, Government of Québec
- 2013, Quebec Heart and Stroke Foundation, Cœur Québec Argent Award
- 2014-2015, Professor of the year, Department of Medicine, Université de Montréal
- 2014, Member of the Order of Canada, Government of Canada
- 2015, Distinguished Lecturer in Cardiovascular Sciences, Canadian Institutes of Health Research's Institute of Circulatory Health Award
- 2015, Fellow, European Society of Cardiology
- 2016, Fellow, Canadian Cardiovascular Society
- 2021, Margolese National Heart Disorders Prize
- 2021, Recognition Award, Department of Medicine, Université de Montréal
- 2022, Member, Royal Society of Canada
