= Desmarais =

Desmarais is a French surname. Notable people with the surname include:

- André Desmarais (born 1956), Canadian businessman
- Charles Desmarais, president of the San Francisco Art Institute
- France Chrétien Desmarais, Canadian lawyer and businesswoman, daughter of Jean Chrétien and wife of André Desmarais
- François-Séraphin Régnier-Desmarais (1632–1713), French ecclesiastic, grammarian, diplomat and poet
- Hélène Desmarais (born 1955), Canadian businesswoman, spouse of Paul Desmarais Jr.
- James Desmarais (born 1979), Canadian professional ice hockey player
- Jean Noël Desmarais (1924–1995), Canadian physician, radiologist, and politician and brother of Louis Desmarais
- Lorraine Desmarais (born 1956), Canadian jazz pianist and composer
- Louis Desmarais (1923–2017), member of the Canadian House of Commons from 1979-1984
- Louis-Élie Desmarais, partner in 19th century Canadian photography studio Desmarais et Cie
- Ludger Desmarais, professional ice hockey player from 1926–1939
- Marcel-Marie Desmarais (1908–1994), Quebec writer, preacher and broadcaster
- Mathurin Desmarais (1653-1700), French pirate and buccaneer
- Odilon Desmarais (1854–1904), Quebec lawyer, judge and politician
- Ovide E. Desmarais (1919–1998), American author of books and detective stories
- Ovila Desmarais, partner in 19th century Canadian photography studio Desmarais et Cie
- Paul Desmarais (1927–2013), Canadian billionaire and CEO of the Power Corporation of Canada
- Paul Desmarais Jr. (born 1954), Canadian businessman, son of Paul Desmarais, and chairman of Power Corporation of Canada
- Pierre DesMarais, Canadian politician and Chairman of Montreal's Executive Committee 1954-1957

== See also ==
- Desmarais, Alberta
- Marais (disambiguation)
