= Jacqueline Desmarais =

Canadian billionaire (1928–2018)

- Born: Jacqueline Maranger; September 20, 1928; Sudbury, Ontario, Canada
- Died: March 3, 2018 (aged 89)
- Known for: Philanthropy
- Spouse: Paul Desmarais (1953-2013; his death)
- Children: 4, including Paul Jr. and André

Jacqueline Desmarais, OC GOQ (September 20, 1928 – March 3, 2018) was a Canadian billionaire, and long-term supporter of music and opera.

== Early life ==
She was born Jacqueline Maranger in Sudbury, Ontario, to Ernest Marenger and Albertine Thanase, on September 20, 1928.

== Career ==
According to Forbes, Desmarais had a net worth of $4.2 billion in January 2015.

She was a long-term supporter of music and opera in Canada, and head of the guild of the Montreal Symphony Orchestra from 1989 to 1999. In 1997, she created a foundation in her name to support young opera singers.

== Honours ==
- In 2011, Desmarais was awarded a Knight of the Legion of Honour from the French President Nicolas Sarkozy, who called her "a great friend to France and a great lady of the arts".
- In 2011, she received an honorary doctorate from the Université de Montréal's faculty of music.
- In 2012, she was made a Grand Officer of the National Order of Quebec.
- In 2013, Desmarais was named an officer of the Order of Canada. In 2016, she was awarded a Companion of Quebec's Order of Arts and Letters.
- In 2016, Montreal's Sainte-Justine Hospital christened the Jacqueline Desmarais Pavilion.

== Personal life ==
On September 8, 1953, at Notre-de-Dame-de-Grâce, Quebec, she wed the financier Paul Desmarais (1927-2013), also a native of Sudbury.

They had two sons: Paul Jr. and André (who is married to Canadian former Prime Minister Jean Chrétien's daughter France) and two daughters, Sophie and Louise.

Jacqueline Desmarais lived on a 75-acre estate at Domaine Laforest à Sagard, Charlevoix, Quebec, until her death in 2018.

== Death ==
Jacqueline Desmarais died on March 3, 2018, aged 89.
