= Paul Desmarais III =

Canadian businessperson

- Born: 8 June 1982 (age 44)
- Education: Lakefield College School; Harvard University; INSEAD
- Occupation: Businessperson
- Employers: Power Corporation of Canada; Power Financial Corporation
- Spouse: Mary Dailey Pattee (m. 2008)
- Parents: Paul Desmarais Jr.; Hélène Desmarais
- Relatives: Paul Desmarais Sr. (grandfather); André Desmarais (uncle); Olivier Desmarais (cousin)

Paul Guy Desmarais III (born 8 June 1982) is a Canadian businessperson and philanthropist.

== Early life and education ==
Desmarais was educated at Lakefield College School and earned a Bachelor of Science degree in economics from Harvard College and a Master of Business Administration degree from INSEAD.

== Career ==
After working at Goldman Sachs, Imerys and Great-West Lifeco, Desmarais became Vice-President of Power Corporation of Canada and Power Financial Corporation in 2014. In January 2017, he was named Senior Vice President of both companies. He is Chairman and CEO of Sagard, an alternative asset manager involved in venture capital, private equity, private credit, real estate and royalties. He is a co-founder of various businesses, such as investment fund Portage Ventures and Diagram Ventures.

In 2019, he was the recipient of the Arnold Edinborough Award (Business / Arts Awards) recognizing his impact on the arts in Canada. In 2000, he was awarded the Duke of Edinburgh's Award (Gold Level).

He is a founder or co-founder of various business-led initiatives, such as the Black Wealth Club, which provides resources to support emerging black leaders, the Young Canadians in Finance and the Indigenous Leadership Circle.

He also acted as co-chair for the Centraide of Greater Montreal 49th fundraising campaign, launched in 2022.

== Personal life ==
Paul Desmarais III is the son of Paul Desmarais Jr. and the grandson of Paul Desmarais.
