= Olivier Desmarais =

Canadian businessman (born 1982)

- Education: Selwyn House School; University of Ottawa; McGill University
- Employer(s): Power Corporation of Canada; Power Financial Corporation
- Parent(s): Andre Desmarais; France Chrétien Desmarais
- Relatives: Jean Chrétien (grandfather); Paul Desmarais (grandfather); Paul Desmarais Jr. (uncle); Paul Desmarais III (cousin)

Olivier Desmarais (born June 1982) is a Canadian businessman and philanthropist. Desmarais is chairman of Power Sustainable, a global alternative asset manager. He is also Senior Vice-President of Power Corporation of Canada and Power Financial since 2017.

== Early life and education ==
Desmarais was educated at Selwyn House School and holds a Bachelor of Civil Law degree from the University of Ottawa and a Bachelor of Arts in Sociology and Political Science from McGill University.

== Career ==
He has been a member of the Québec Bar since 2009. Desmarais became Vice-President Power Corporation of Canada and Power Financial in 2017. Since January 2017, he has been Senior Vice President of Power Corporation of Canada and Power Financial. Through his current role, Mr. Desmarais is highly involved with Power Energy Corporation, In November 2018, Desmarais was named Chair of the Canada-China Business Council (CCBC). Desmarais is a Director of Canada Life, IG Wealth Management and Mackenzie. He has been Chairman of Power Energy Corporation since 2015 and is a director of Lumenpulse.

== Philanthropy ==
Desmarais is a board member of the Montreal General Hospital Foundation, and the Canadian Institute for Advanced Research. Desmarais is a member of the Voltigeurs de Québec.

== Personal life ==
He is the son of André Desmarais and the grandson of Paul Desmarais and former Canadian Prime minister Jean Chrétien.
