= Montreal Heart Institute =

Hospital in Montreal, Quebec, Canada

- Université de Montréal Faculty of Medicine

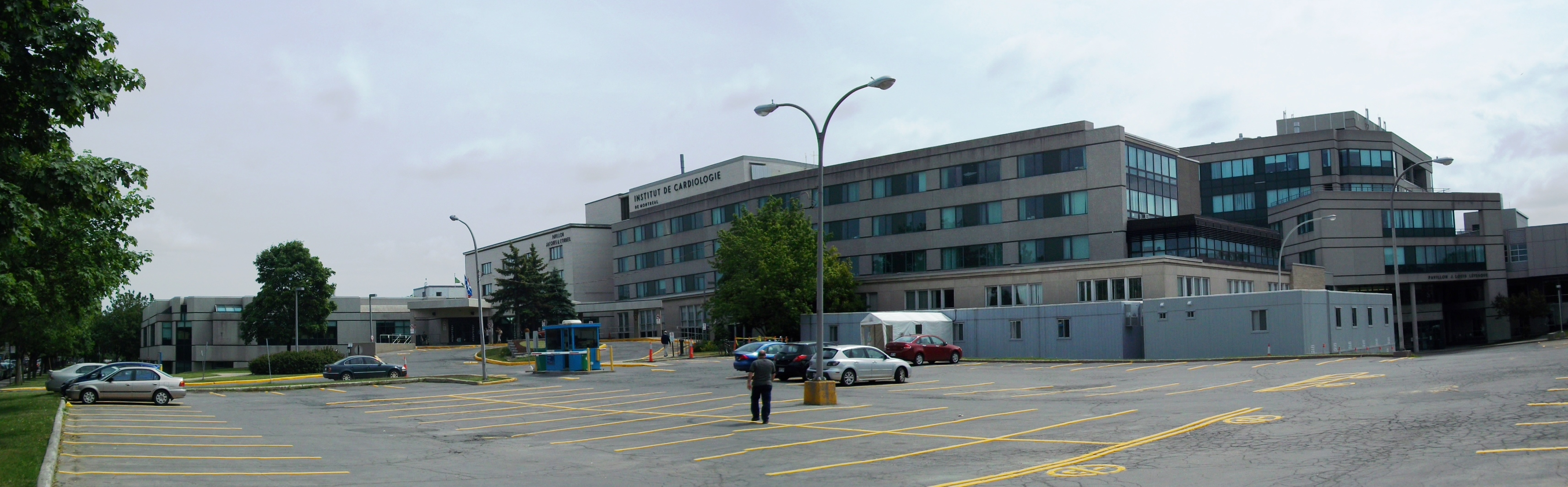

Geography
- Location: 5000 Bélanger street, Montreal, Quebec, Canada
- Coordinates: 45.5738°N 73.5778°W

Organization
- Care system: RAMQ (Quebec Health Insurance Board)
- Type: Specialist
- Affiliated university: Université de Montréal Faculty of Medicine

Services
- Beds: 153
- Speciality: Cardiology, Anesthesiology, Heart surgery, Internal medicine, Nuclear medicine, Psychosomatic medicine, Physiatry, Radiology

History
- Founded: 1954

Links
- Website: icm-mhi.org
- Lists: Hospitals in Canada

The Montreal Heart Institute (MHI) (French: Institut de Cardiologie de Montréal), in Montreal, Quebec, is a specialty hospital dedicated to the development of cardiology, which is affiliated with the Université de Montréal. The MHI is founded in 1954 by Paul David, and along with the Ottawa Heart Institute is considered one of the largest cardiology institutes in the world, which is the first educational hospital on cardiovascular diseases in Canada, and is ranked as one of the largest preventive medicine centres in Quebec.

Prominent Montreal businessman J. Louis Levesque was a major benefactor whose initial $1 million donation in 1969 doubled the research department's budget. Levesque supported the Institute for more than a quarter of a century, donating more than $10 million.

The MHI was ranked number one research hospital in Canada for researcher intensity, and research expenditure per researcher, on the 2015 list of "Canada's Top 40 Research Hospitals" published by Research Infosource.

== See also ==
- Montreal Chest Institute
- Montreal Heart Institute Foundation
