= Sudbury and Copper Cliff Suburban Electric Railway =

Interurban railway in Ontario, Canada

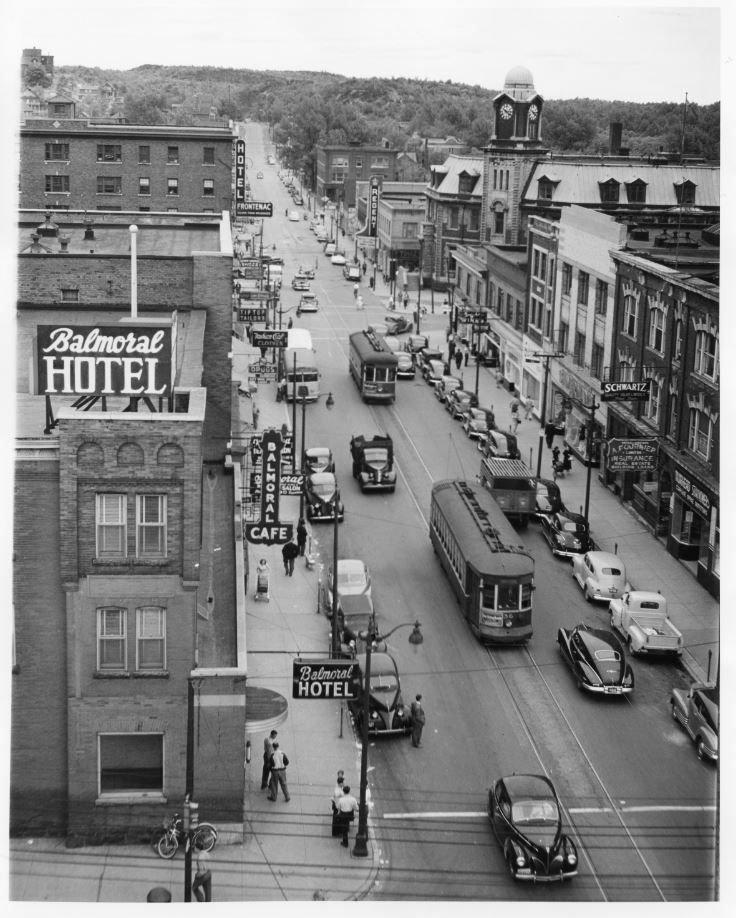
- SCCSER cars follow the Elm Street running past the Balmoral Hotel, as seen in 1948.

Operation
- Locale: Greater Sudbury, Ontario, Canada
- Open: 11 November 1915
- Close: 1 October 1950
- Status: Closed
- Lines: 3
- Owner: Desmarais family

Infrastructure
- Propulsion system: Electricity
- Depots: Northwest corner of St. Charles Avenue and Notre Dame Avenue

Statistics
- Route length: 6 miles (9.7 km)

The Sudbury and Copper Cliff Suburban Electric Railway was a privately owned electric interurban railway and streetcar system that connected several neighbourhoods in the town (and later city) of Sudbury, along with what was then the town of Copper Cliff in Ontario, Canada. Incorporated in 1912, the company began revenue passenger service in November 1915. It ultimately grew into a system of three radial lines which joined together in downtown Sudbury. By the late 1940s, however, rail service was being supplemented with diesel buses. Rail service ended in October 1950 and was completely replaced with bus service, which over time evolved into municipal Sudbury Transit and later GOVA services.

== History ==
The early history of the railway was coloured by concerns about Copper Cliff becoming a suburb of Sudbury. An earlier 1906 plan for a Sudbury, Copper Cliff, and Creighton Electric Railway that would have connected the two centres with the now-abandoned mining town of Creighton had been discarded after heavy opposition from Copper Cliff merchants, who feared the decline of the town's commercial core due to competition with Sudbury, which had over six times as many businesses. The same merchants also opposed the new plan, but were overruled by a vote by Copper Cliff ratepayers.

Early on, the railway company was run by Noël Desmarais, a local Franco-Ontarian businessman and grandfather of the financier Paul Desmarais, who later owned and managed the company. It began operations in 1912 with a single car that was borrowed from the Toronto Suburban Railway. The car was never returned and operated on the SCCSER until the early 1930s when it was sold for scrap. Service was only provided to Copper Cliff initially, with the lines on Notre Dame and Elgin opening shortly afterwards. The railway received electric power through the Wahnapitae Power Company, which was privately owned until it was acquired by the Hydro-Electric Power Commission of Ontario in 1930.

The railway received a major boost in ridership by the decision of the Canadian Copper Company, after the instating of the eight-hour day, to limit the growth of Copper Cliff in favour of a workforce that commuted from Sudbury. It was also around this time that the small constellation of informal industrial villages such as East Smelter, Orford Village, and Shantytown disappeared or were consolidated into the urban centre of Copper Cliff. In Sudbury, the population of certain ethnic groups, such as Finns, began to grow, as immigrant mine and smelter workers could now live in Sudbury and commute to work at the industrial operations around Copper Cliff. At the time, the Sudbury Star reported that while in 1915, only about twenty workers commuted from Sudbury to Copper Cliff, a year later that number had risen to more than two hundred. On the far west end of Sudbury, the area around the Copper Cliff Road (later known as Lorne Street), which was also the route of the railway and which had previously been the site of the Gatchell family farm and dairy, was gradually subdivided and became the site of Sudbury's "first real suburban development." Gatchell became a predominantly Italian neighbourhood, one which mirrored Copper Cliff's Little Italy. Similarly, the West End neighbourhood grew extensively around this time along the Copper Cliff Road and Regent Street corridors.

The railway company was not initially very financially successful, and was unable to pay dividends to its shareholders. In 1920, shareholders proposed that the town of Sudbury buy them out, which failed in a 4–2 town council vote. By 1928, an audit of the town's finances recommended that the town form a reserve in case the railway's debts to the town, which dated back to 1916, were realized as a loss.

In 1943, the workers at the railway unionized, but by then its time was nearly over as the SCCSER began buying buses in 1947. The line to Bell Park was the first to close in 1948 with the two other lines ceasing service in 1950. The SCCSER rolling stock sat at the carhouse for more than two years, finally being cut up for scrap in 1953. The SCCSER was reorganized in 1951 and renamed Sudbury Bus Lines Limited. Shortly after, it was purchased for a symbolic $1 by the financier Paul Desmarais, who used it as a platform for buying up a number of bus lines throughout Ontario, allowing him to launch his business empire. Bus operations would continue under the new name until 1966, when the company ceased operations and was replaced by Laurentian Transit, which was a consortium of local private bus companies. It in turn was supplanted by Sudbury Transit in 1972, the direct predecessor to the current GOVA municipal transit agency.

== Routes ==
The SCCSER had three main routes radiating from Elm Street in downtown Sudbury.

=== Western line ===
The westerly (and busiest) route ran a short distance from the Elm/Durham intersection to Lorne Street, where it turned south and entered dedicated trackage along the east side of the road. After about 100 metres (330 ft), the streetcar line and the road angled southwest, running parallel to the Canadian Pacific Railway's Webbwood Subdivision. At Gatchell, the streetcar line split into two tracks opposite Tuddenham Street to facilitate the passing of cars in rush hour. The line, once again single-track, then continued southwest, passing underneath the INCO railway via a specially constructed underpass to a junction near Balsam Street in Copper Cliff, where it met the shuttle to the Inco refinery a short distance away. The line then angled northwest and ended at the two-track station near downtown Copper Cliff. It operated right up until the end of rail service in 1950. In addition to this service there was also a short-turn service that ended at Gatchell during peak hours.

=== Northern line ===
The northerly route ran from a wye at the Elm/Durham intersection to the SCCSER carhouse at St. Charles Street. This line was entirely single-track and operated for a short distance in the middle of Notre Dame Avenue before entering its own right-of-way on the east side of the road parallel to the CP Stobie Spur. This line operated right up until the end of service in 1950, but had been replaced by buses during peak periods in its last months of operation to clear the line for cars deadheading to and from the carhouse.

=== Eastern line ===
The easterly line ran east in the middle of Elm Street for approximately 75 metres (246 ft) before turning south on Lisgar Street, west on Cedar Street, and south again on Durham Street. This odd arrangement was rumoured to have existed to ensure the carline's passage by a liquor store owned by a controlling interest in the SCCSER, but was more likely done to avoid crossing the CP Stobie Spur twice. Coming to the end of the trackage on Durham, the line entered a private right of way on the south side of Elgin Street and angled southeast parallel to the CP mainline through downtown. Passing the downtown Sudbury CP station at Van Horne, the line turned south across the Nelson Street "Iron" bridge (which was repurposed into a pedestrian bridge and is still used as such today ) and continued in the middle of Nelson Street to John Street, turning east and running one block to Elizabeth Street, where it turned south once again and ran down the middle of Elizabeth to Bell Park on the shore of Ramsey Lake. This line was also entirely single-track and ceased service in 1948 after the tracks on Lisgar Street were accidentally paved over by a contractor doing road repairs there.

== The SCCSER today ==
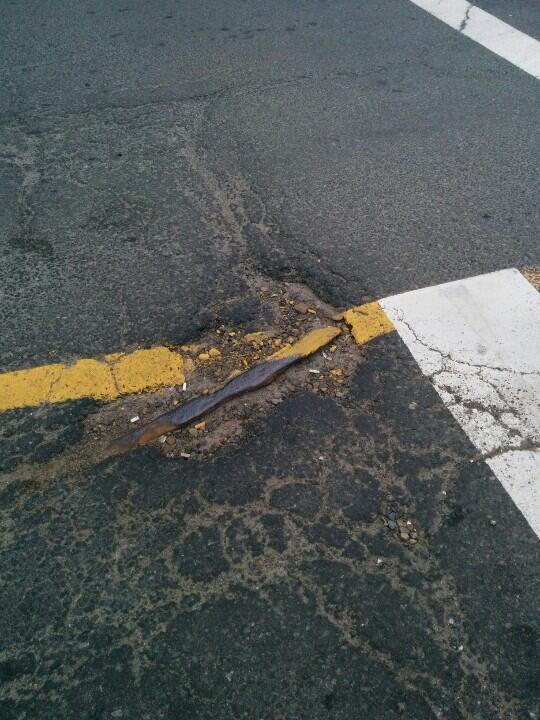
A remnant of the railway's eastern line embedded into Lisgar Street at Elm Street.

Today the SCCSER has all but vanished. None of the streetcar equipment was ever retained for preservation. The streetcar alignments on Lorne and Notre Dame have since been obliterated by road-widening projects and all track was removed from city streets. Traces of the right-of-way near Copper Cliff, including the INCO railway underpass are purported to exist, however they could not be found on any satellite photographs of the area.

A fare box used on the railway has survived and is preserved as an artifact at the Flour Mill Museum in the same neighbourhood where the original car barns were located.

== See also ==
- List of street railways in Canada
- List of Ontario railways
- List of defunct Canadian railways
- Interurban
- Streetcar
- History of rail transport in Canada
- Public transport in Canada
