= Montreal Museum of Fine Arts =

- Musée des beaux-arts de Montréal
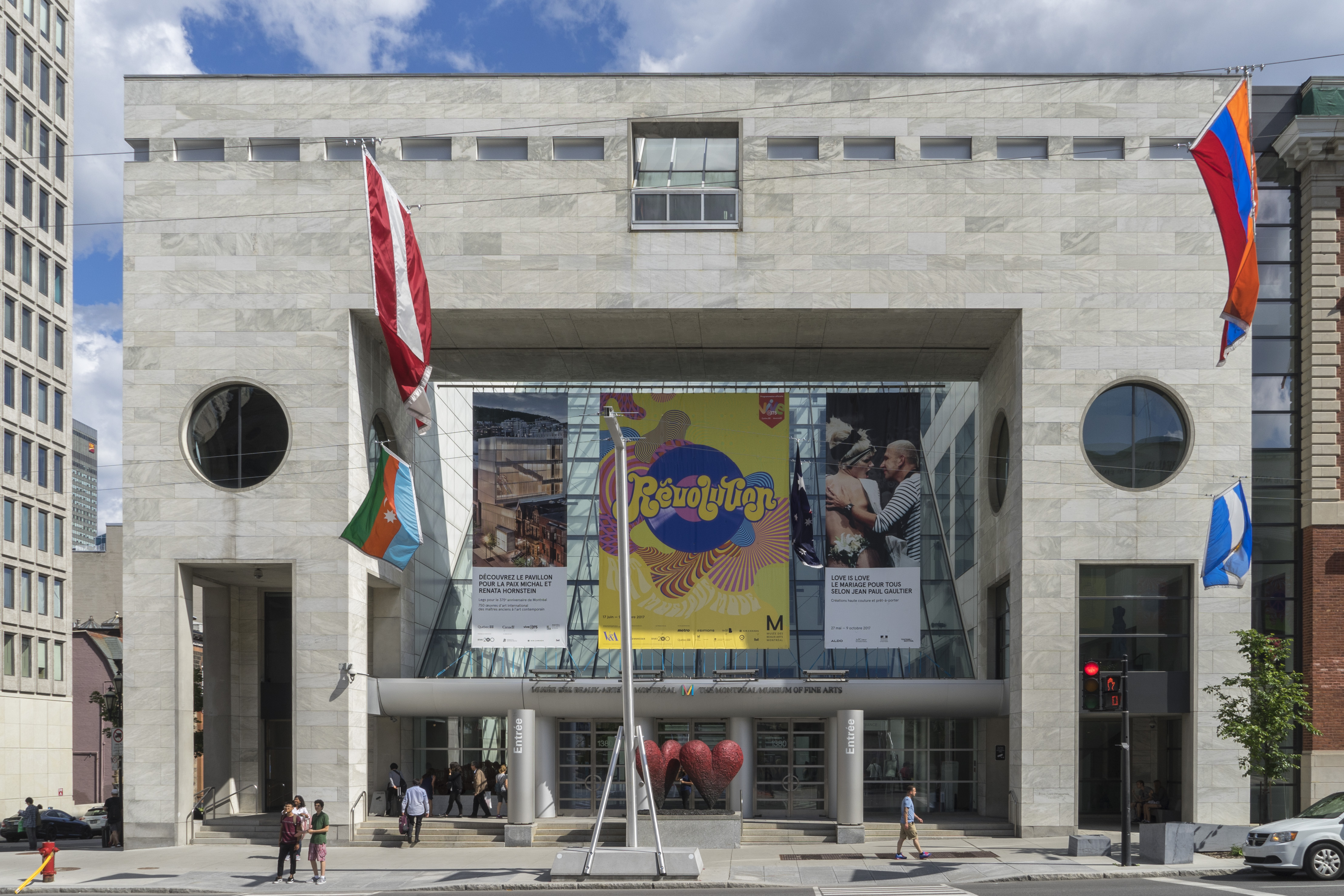
- Interactive fullscreen map
- Established: 23 April 1860; 166 years ago
- Location: 1380 Sherbrooke West; Montreal, Quebec; H3G 1J5
- Coordinates: 45.4987°N 73.5801°W
- Type: Art museum
- Visitors: 1.3 million (2017)
- Director: Stéphane Aquin
- Public transit access: Guy–Concordia; Peel
- Website: www.mbam.qc.ca/en

The Montreal Museum of Fine Arts (MMFA; French: Musée des beaux-arts de Montréal, MBAM) is an art museum in Montreal, Quebec, Canada. It is the largest art museum in Canada by gallery space. The museum is located on the historic Golden Square Mile stretch of Sherbrooke Street West.

The MMFA is spread across five pavilions, and occupies a total floor area of 53,095 square metres (571,510 sq ft), 13,000 (140,000 sq ft) of which are exhibition space. With the 2016 inauguration of the Michal and Renata Hornstein Pavilion for Peace, the museum campus was expected to become the eighteenth largest art museum in North America. The permanent collection included approximately 44,000 works in 2013. The original "reading room" of the Art Association of Montreal was the precursor of the museum's current library, the oldest art library in Canada.

The Montreal Museum of Fine Arts is a member of the International Group of Organizers of Large-scale Exhibitions, also known as the Bizot Group, a forum which allows the leaders of the largest museums in the world to exchange works and exhibitions.

Founded in 1860, it is the oldest art museum in Canada. In 2020, it was the most visited art museum in Canada.

== History ==
=== Beginnings ===
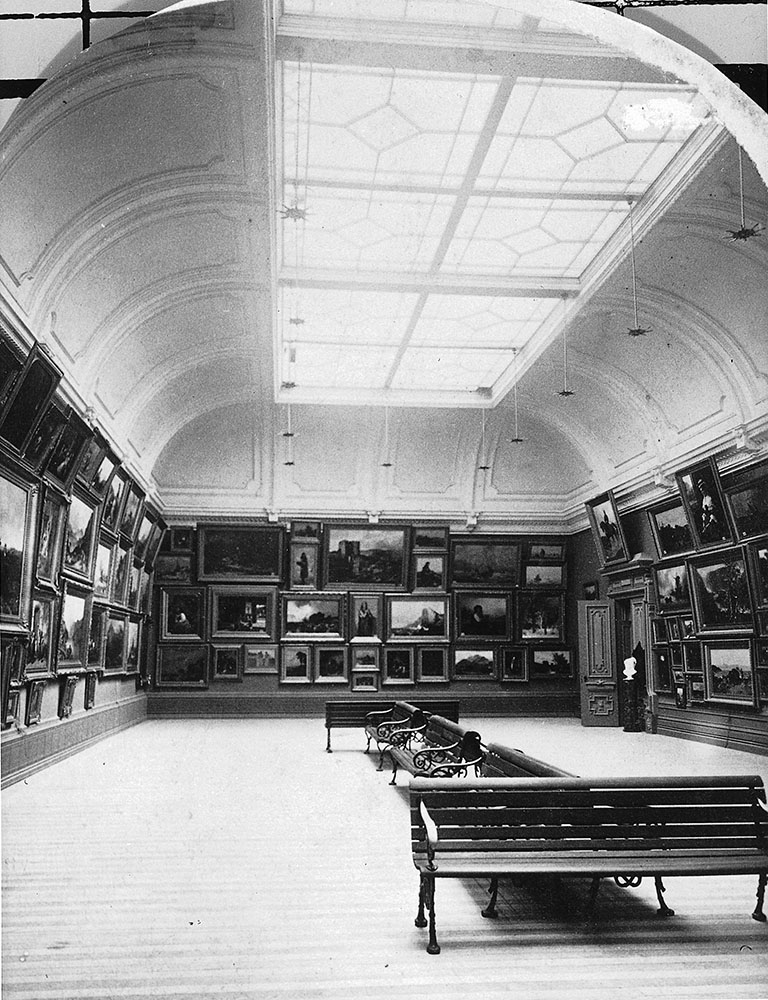
Exhibition room, Art Gallery, Montreal, 1879

Founded in April 1860 by Anglican bishop Francis Fulford, the Art Association of Montreal was created to "encourage the appreciation of fine arts among the people of the city".

Since it did not have a permanent place to store acquisitions the Art Association was not able to acquire works to display nor to seek works from collectors. During the following twenty years, the organization had an itinerant existence during which its shows and expositions were held in various Montreal venues.

In 1877, the Art Association received an exceptional gift from Benaiah Gibb, a Montreal businessman. He gave the core of his art collection consisting of 72 canvases and 4 bronzes. In addition he donated to the Montreal institution a building site on the north-east corner of Phillips Square and further the sum of money of $8,000. This latter gift was on condition that a new museum be constructed on the site within three years. On the 26 May 1879, the Governor General of Canada, Sir John Douglas Sutherland Campbell, inaugurated the Art Gallery of the Art Association of Montreal, the first building in the history of Canada to be constructed specifically for the purpose of housing an art collection. The Art Gallery at Phillips Square, designed by the Hopkins and Wily architecture firm, comprised an exhibition room, another smaller room (known as the Reading Room) reserved for graphic works as well as a lecture hall and an embryonic art school. The museum was enlarged in 1893 by founding member G. Drummond's nephew, Andrew Thomas Taylor, with decorative carving by sculptor Henry Beaumont. The Art Association held an annual show of works created by its members as well as a Spring Salon devoted to the works of living Canadian Artists.

The gift made by Benaiah Gibb was a watershed event in the founding of the museum's collection. The generous gift engaged a keen interest in the public and, because of it, the donations multiplied.

=== Move to Sherbrooke Street West ===
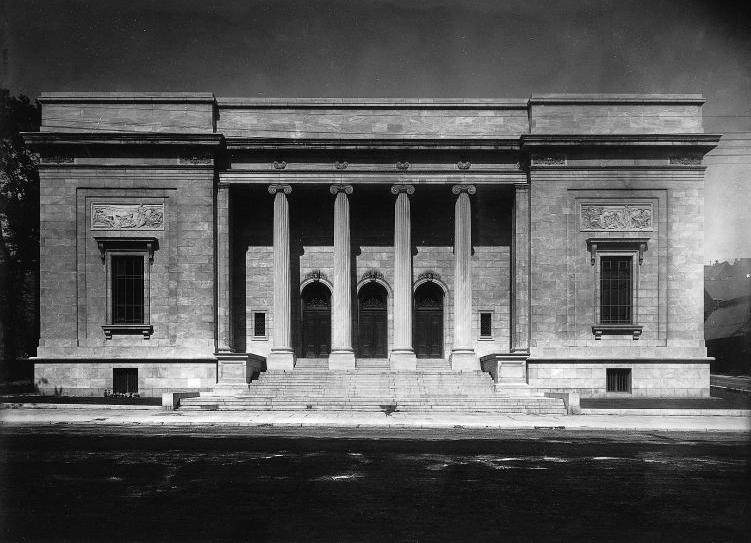
The New Art Gallery (today the Michal and Renata Hornstein Pavilion) seen on Sherbrooke Street West in 1913

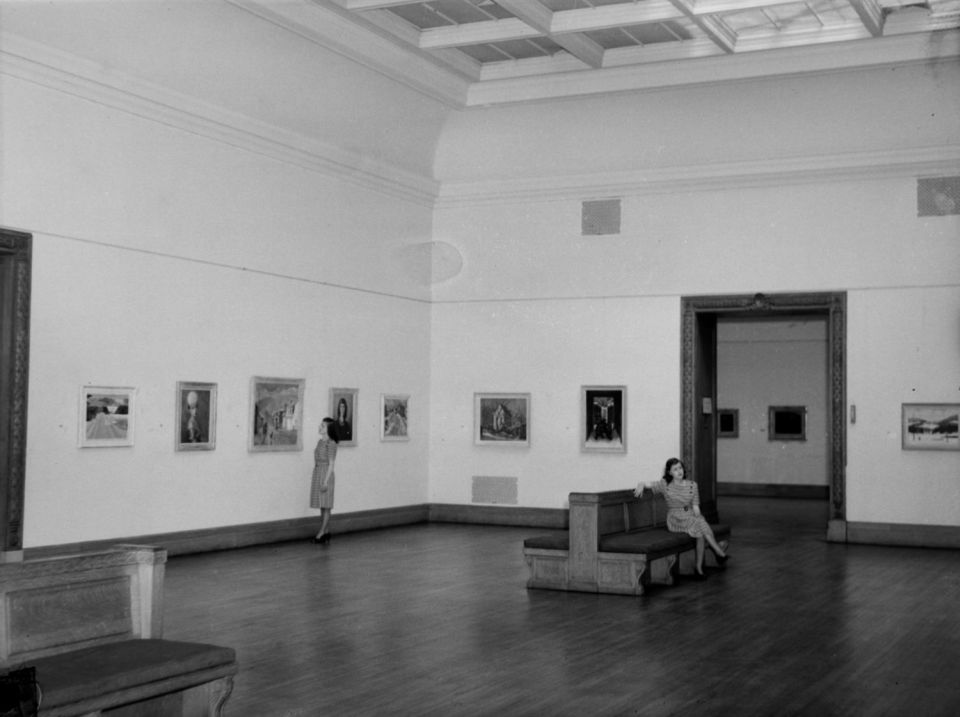
Interior in 1948

Too cramped at its original location, the Art Association strongly considered the idea of moving from Phillips Square to the Golden Square Mile, where most of the city's financial elite lived at the time. They settled on the site of the abandoned Holton House, on Sherbrooke Street West, for the construction of the new museum. Senator Robert Mackay, the owner of the property, was convinced to sell the house for a good price. A committee responsible for the construction of the museum was formed consisting of James Ross, Richard B. Angus, Vincent Meredith, Louis-Joseph Forget and David Morrice (the father of painter James Wilson Morrice). Most members of this committee offered a considerable amount of their own money for the construction of the museum. This included a large donation by businessman James Ross. The Phillip's Square location was demolished in 1912, and is now an office tower with shops on the ground floor.

A limited architectural design competition was conducted to select an architect among three architectural firms that were invited to apply. The museum committee selected the project proposed by brothers Edward Maxwell and William Sutherland Maxwell. Trained in the Beaux-Arts tradition, they proposed a building that catered to French taste of the time: sober and majestic. Work began in the summer of 1910 and finished in the fall of 1912.

On December 9, 1912, the Governor General of Canada, Prince Arthur, Duke of Connaught and Strathearn, inaugurated the new Museum of the Art Association of Montreal on Sherbrooke Street West in front of 3,000 people present for the occasion.

=== Modern era ===
In 1949, the Art Association of Montreal was renamed as the Montreal Museum of Fine Arts, which was more representative of the institution's mandate.

In 1972, the MMFA became a semi-public institution funded mainly by government funds.

An expansion of the museum was undertaken during the 1970s culminating in 1976, with the opening of the Liliane and David M. Stewart Pavilion. Designed by architect Fred Lebensold the building backs directly onto the back of the Michal and Renata Hornstein Pavilion. The building's architecture is modernist, made of concrete structures located along du Musée Avenue and in contrast with the classical architecture of the first pavilion. It was controversial at the time, despite innovations like the ceiling box for a track lighting and large open interior. The pavilion houses nearly 900 decorative art and design objects. Most objects were donated by Liliane and David M. Stewart, hence the name of the pavilion. The collection includes furniture, glass, silverware, textiles, ceramics and works of industrial design. These objects were made of a variety materials, reflecting their origins in different countries and time periods.

The appointment of Bernard Lamarre in 1982 as president of the board of directors and the new director, Alexander Gaudieri (1983–1988), revitalized the museum after several difficult years. In the mid-1980s, he proposed a major expansion of the museum. This proposal led to the construction of the Jean-Noël Desmarais Pavilion. In 1991, the museum's third building, designed by Moshe Safdie, was built on the south side of Sherbrooke Street. It was funded by contributions from governments and the members of the business community, notably the Desmarais family. Safdie's architectural design incorporated the facade of New Sherbrooke Apartments, an apartment-hotel that occupied the site since 1905.

=== 1972 robbery ===
On September 4, 1972, the museum was the site of the largest art theft in Canadian history, when armed thieves made off with jewellery, figurines and 18 paintings worth a total of $2 million at the time (approximately $15 million today), including works by Delacroix, Gainsborough and a rare Rembrandt landscape (Landscape with Cottages). One painting, believed at the time to have been a Jan Brueghel the Elder but later reattributed to one of his students, was returned by the thieves as a way of opening ransom negotiations; the rest have never been recovered. The thieves likewise have never been identified, although there is at least one informal suspect. In 2003, The Globe and Mail estimated that the Rembrandt alone would be worth $1 million.

With the insurance money from the theft, the museum bought a large Peter Paul Rubens painting, The Leopards, which it promoted as the largest Rubens in Canada. However, years later a conservator had the paint tested and found that the red pigments in it were mixed around 1687, four decades after Rubens died; the painting has since been reattributed to Rubens' students. In 2007, on the 35th anniversary of the theft, it was removed from exhibit and remains in storage.

=== 2011 theft ===
One day before the 39th anniversary of the 1972 theft, a visitor took a 20-by-21-centimetre (7.9 by 8.3 in) Roman marble head from the 1st century CE from its pedestal. The perpetrator was able to escape the museum before the head's absence was discovered. Late in October 2011, about eight weeks after the original theft, a similarly sized sandstone relief of a guard's head dating to 5th-century-BCE Persia was stolen the same way. The two works were valued at $1.3 million together.

In late 2013, a tip led investigators to the home of Simon Metke, an Edmonton man. The Sûreté du Québec, in conjunction with the Royal Canadian Mounted Police, executed a search warrant and recovered the Persian piece in January 2014. He was charged with possession of stolen property, possessing the proceeds of a crime and possessing a controlled substance for the purpose of trafficking; his girlfriend faced the latter two charges as well.

Metke pled guilty to the first charge in April 2017. He and the prosecutors agreed that while he did not know the relief had been stolen, he could have taken more steps to ascertain that it had not been than just doing a Google search on "Is a Mesopotamian artifact missing?" He received a conditional discharge with probation and community service as his sentence; a character in the 2016 film Yoga Hosers was inspired by him after the story was reported in the media.

The insurance company had taken legal ownership of the relief as a result of paying the claim, and while the museum could have bought it back by simply repaying the claim it declined to do so, as the relief was offered for sale at the 2016 Frieze Art Fair. While police suggested at the time of Metke's arrest they had some leads on the thief, he has not been identified. The Roman head also remains missing as of 2017.

== Pavilions ==
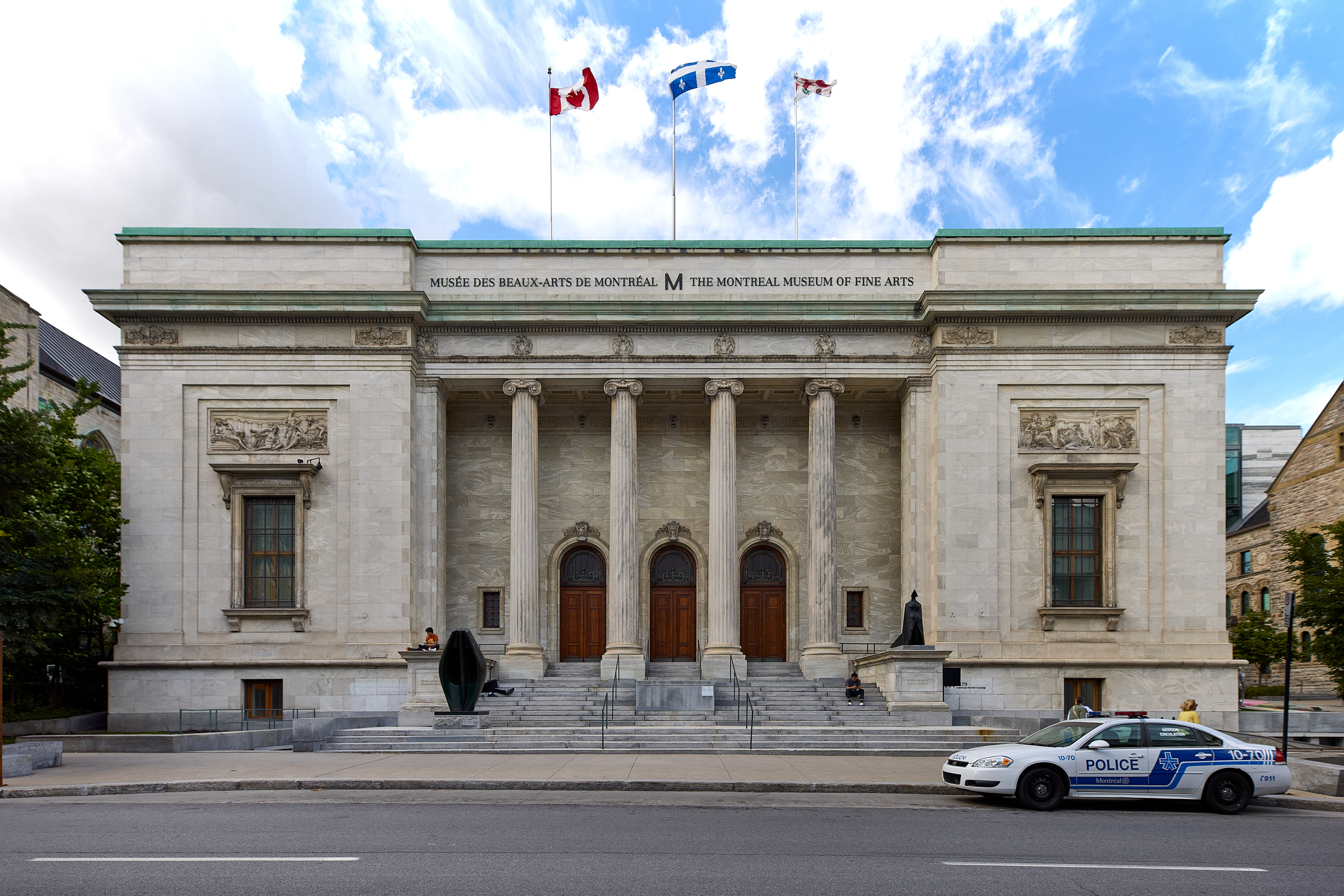
Michal and Renata Hornstein Pavilion

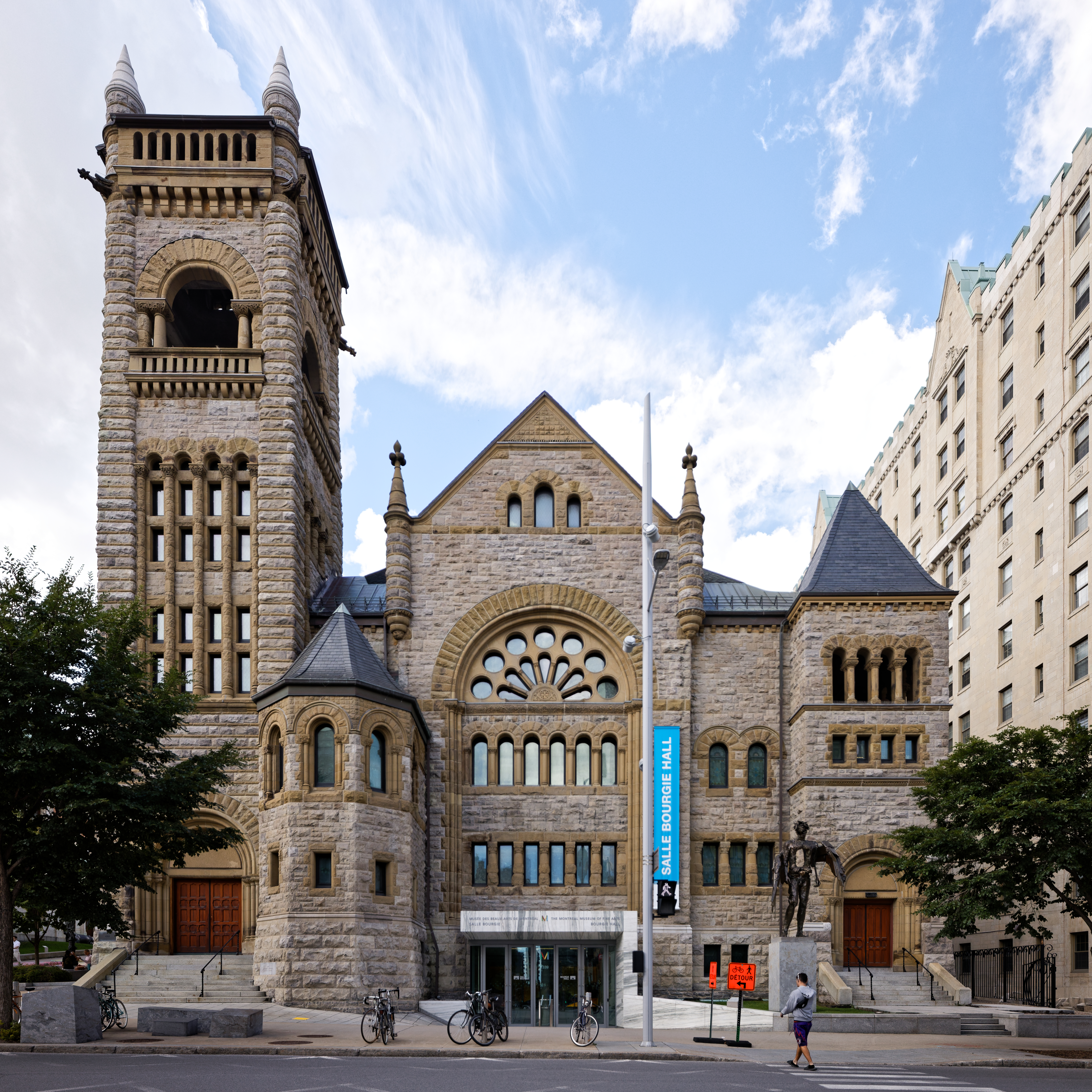
Claire and Marc Bourgie Pavilion, Montreal Museum of Fine Arts, formerly the Erskine and American United Church

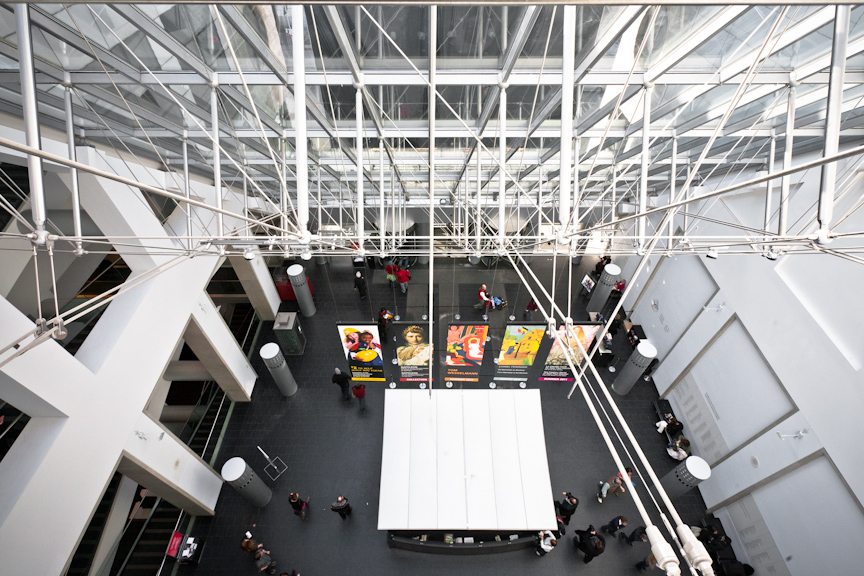
Atrium of the Jean-Noël Desmarais Pavilion, Montreal Museum of Fine Arts

The museum is partitioned into five pavilions: a 1912 Beaux Arts building designed by William Sutherland Maxwell and brother Edward Maxwell, now named the Michal and Renata Hornstein Pavilion; the modernist Jean-Noël Desmarais Pavilion across the street, designed by Moshe Safdie, built in 1991; the Liliane and David M. Stewart Pavilion, the Claire and Marc Bourgie Pavilion built 2011 and the Michal and Renata Hornstein Pavilion for Peace, winner of a Governor General's Medal in Architecture in 2018.

The Jean-Noël Desmarais Pavilion houses modern and contemporary art, with the Arts of One World, in its Stephan Crétier and Stéphany Maillery Wing, made up of 10 galleries that feature more than 1,200 objects from every continent, from the 4th millennium BCE to today. The Michal and Renata Hornstein Pavilion contains the new Inuit art galleries. The Lilian and David M. Stewart Pavilion is devoted to decorative arts and design. The Claire and Marc Bourgie Pavilion houses Quebec and Canadian art. The Michal and Renata Hornstein Pavilion for Peace is the home of Early to Modern International Art.

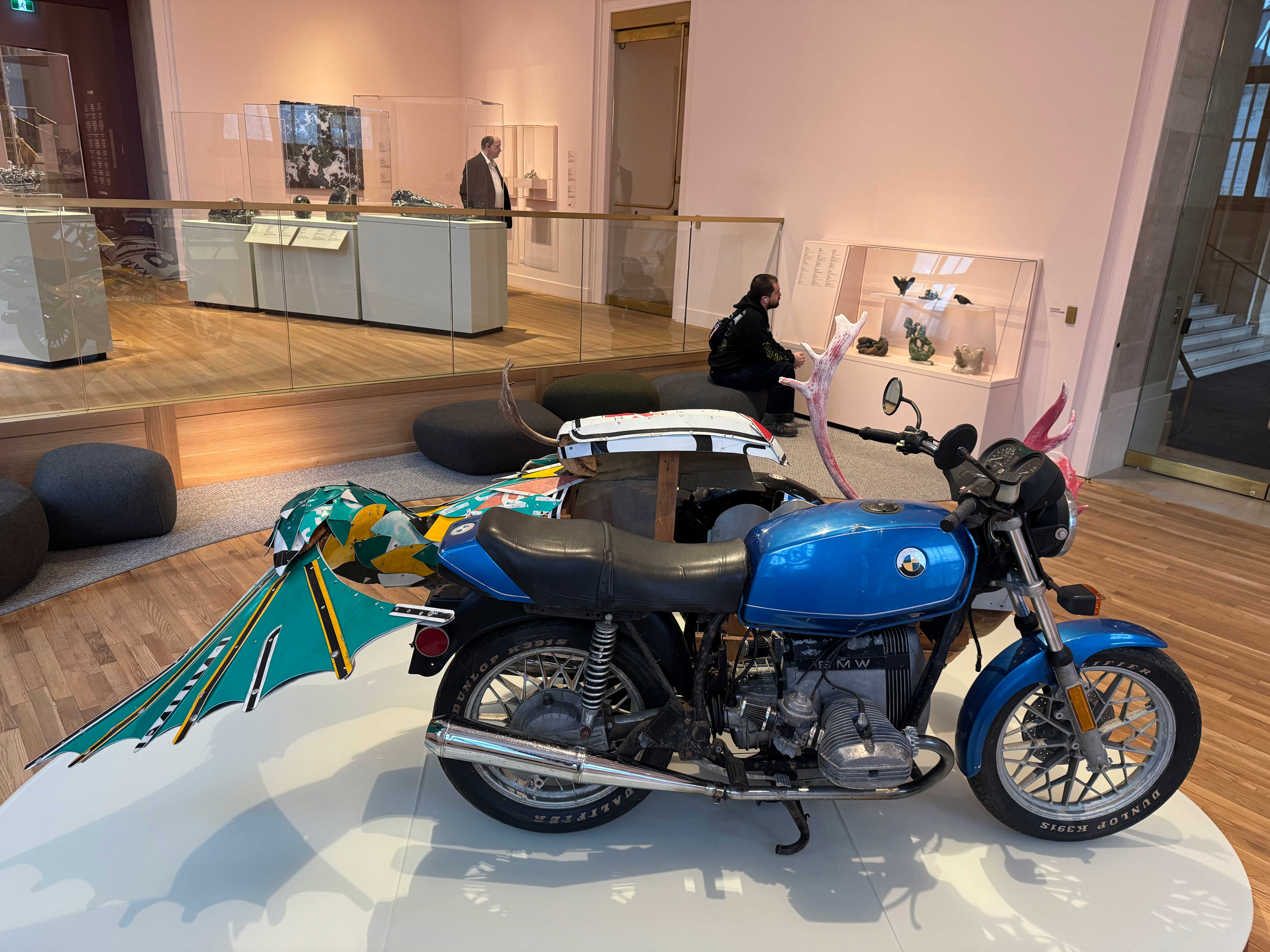
Inuit Arts Gallery in the Michal and Renata Hornstein Pavilion

On February 14, 2007, the museum's administration board announced its project to convert the Erskine and American United Church, located on Sherbrooke Street West, into a Canadian art pavilion. This pavilion allowed the museum to double the display surface dedicated to Canadian artists. A Romanesque Revival church with Tiffany stained glass, dating from 1893 to 1894, the church had been designated a National Historic Site of Canada in 1998. It was named the Claire and Marc Bourgie Pavilion in recognition of the family's considerable financial support and opened in 2010.

In the summer of 2024, the Museum redesigned its outdoor spaces, specifically du Musée Avenue, Sherbrooke Street West and Bishop Street bordering several of the Museum’s pavilions, into a renewed Sculpture Garden.

The Montreal Museum of Fine Arts occupies a surface area of 53,095 square metres (571,510 sq ft), of which 13,000 square metres (140,000 sq ft) is dedicated to exhibition space. The expansion makes it the eighteenth largest art museum in North America.

Pavilion	Surface area
Michal and Renata Hornstein Pavilion (1912)	5,546 m^{2} (59,700 sq ft)
Liliane and David M. Stewart Pavilion (1976)	9,610 m^{2} (103,400 sq ft)
Jean-Noël Desmarais Pavilion (1991)	22,419 m^{2} (241,320 sq ft)
Claire and Marc Bourgie Pavilion (2011)	5,460 m^{2} (58,800 sq ft)
Michal and Renata Hornstein Pavilion for Peace (2017)	4,363 m^{2} (46,960 sq ft)
Sculpture Garden	2,033 m^{2} (21,880 sq ft)
total:	48,528 m^{2} (522,350 sq ft)

== Collection ==
In 1892, John W. Tempest bequeathed sixty oil paintings and watercolor paintings as well as a trust fund for the purchase of works of art. This was the main source of income for the museum's acquisition of European paintings until the 1950s.

In the late 19th and early 20th century, the large art collections owned by many prominent Montreal families became dispersed through shared inheritance. However, some heirs made large donations to the museum, such members of the Drummond, Angus, Van Horne, and Hosmer families, among others. In 1927, a collection of over 300 objects, including 150 paintings, was donated by the descendants of Baron Strathcona and Mount Royal.

In 1917, the Art Association of Montreal created a department devoted to the decorative arts. The department was entrusted to Frederick Cleveland Morgan, who became the curator of the collection on a voluntary basis from 1917 until his death in 1962. Morgan added more than 7,000 pieces in the form of acquisitions, bequests or donations to the museum's collection. He also expanded the mandate of the museum, from an institution dedicated solely to the fine arts to an encyclopedic museum, open to all forms of art.

Since 1955, the museum gained the acquisition funds it needed to buy Canadian or foreign works from the legacy of Horsley and Annie Townsend. Several gifts and bequests are made by the heirs or descendants of the collectors who founded the Art Association. Other donations come from new donors such as Joseph Arthur Simard, who in 1959 offered a collection of 3,000 Japanese incense boxes that belonged to the French statesman Georges Clemenceau.

In 1960, the centennial of the founding of the Art Association of Montreal was highlighted by the publication of a catalog of selected works from the collection and a museum guide.

On September 4, 1972, a major theft took place at the museum. Fifty objects were taken including eighteen paintings, including works by Peter Paul Rubens, Rembrandt, Jean-Baptiste-Camille Corot and Eugène Delacroix that were never recovered.

Major contributions have been made by Renata and Michal Hornstein since the 1970s. These have included works by Old Masters, as well as several of the largest collections of drawings of the Swiss painter Ferdinand Hodler.

These gifts expanded the range of the museum's collections, and reached a peak in 2000, with admission of the modern design collection assembled by Liliane M. Stewart and David M. Stewart, long a part of the Montreal Decorative Arts Museum and exhibited at the MMFA from 1997 to 2000. Liliane M. Stewart donated over 5,000 objects to the museum's collection (estimated value of C$15 million).

The Museum has said it "is the custodian of an Indigenous arts collection that reflects and prioritizes the material, conceptual and cultural diversity of Indigenous artists of the Woodlands, the Circumpolar regions, as well as other shores and lands farther south." It has held exhibitions of artists from First Nations, Inuit and Métis communities in Canada, as well as from Indigenous communities elsewhere in the world, since at least the late 2000s. Since the 1950s, the Museum has collected prints, textiles, wampum beadwork, photographs, paintings, sculptures, video and installations by Inuit artists. In the Michal and Renata Hornstein Pavilion for Peace, the Museum has more than doubled the space allocated to Inuit art. The Museum has allocated more than 10 percent of its budget each year toward increasing its Indigenous art collection. It also has been working with Inuit advisers. In 2023, the Museum hired its first curator of Indigenous arts.

== Looted art controversies and restitutions ==
In 1964, the Budapest Museum of Fine Arts demanded the return of a 16th century painting by Giorgio Vasari, which the Montreal Museum had acquired in 1963. Budapest said it was included in a 1952 catalog of war losses. After initially rejecting the request, an agreement was reached. In 2005, the heirs of Dutch art dealer Jacques Goudstikker requested the return of The Deification of Aeneas, a 17th-century work by Charles Le Brun. In 2013, the museum returned Gerrit van Honthorst's The Duet (1623–24) to the heirs of Jewish art collector Bruno Spiro, from whom it had been confiscated by the Nazis.

The museum publishes online a list of artworks with incomplete provenances for the Nazi years 1933 to 1945.

== Affiliations ==
The museum is affiliated with the Canadian Museums Association, the Canadian Heritage Information Network, and the Virtual Museum of Canada.

== See also ==
- Culture of Montreal
- List of art museums
- List of largest art museums
- List of museums in Montreal
