= André Desmarais =

Canadian businessman

André Desmarais OC OQ
- Born: October 26, 1956 (age 69); Ottawa, Ontario, Canada
- Education: Lakefield College School; Selwyn House School
- Alma mater: Concordia University
- Spouse: France Chrétien (m. 1981)
- Children: 4 including Olivier Desmarais
- Parent(s): Paul Desmarais Sr. Jacqueline Maranger
- Relatives: Paul Desmarais Jr. (brother)

André Roger Desmarais OC OQ (born October 26, 1956) is a Canadian businessman and philanthropist.

== Early life ==
He is the youngest son of Paul Desmarais Sr. and Jacqueline Desmarais. Born in Ottawa, Ontario, he attended Lakefield College School in Ontario for two years, then Selwyn House School. Desmarais is a graduate of Concordia University in Montreal (BComm 78, LLD 07).

== Career ==
André Desmarais is currently deputy chairman of the company his father took control of in 1968, Power Corporation, based in Montreal, Quebec, Canada. He is also deputy chairman of Power Financial. Power Corporation is an international management and holding company that focuses on financial services in North America, Europe and Asia. Its core holdings are leading insurance, retirement, wealth management and investment businesses, including a portfolio of alternative asset investment platforms. Through its European-based affiliate, the Pargesa group, it also has significant holdings in a portfolio of global companies based in Europe.

Desmarais began his career at Campeau Corporation in 1979. From 1980 to 1981, he was special assistant to the Minister of Justice of Canada. Between 1981 and 1982, he was an institutional investment counsellor at Richardson Greenshields Ltd. In 1983, Desmarais returned to Power Corporation of Canada. In 1984, he was appointed president and chief operating officer of Gesca ltée and chairman and chief executive officer of Power Broadcasting Inc., in 1988. In 1991, he became president and chief operating officer of Power Corporation of Canada. In 1994, he was named chairman of Power Pacific Corporation Limited; director and member of the executive committee of Power Corporation of Canada and Power Financial Corporation. In 1996, Desmarais was appointed president and co-chief executive officer of Power Corporation of Canada and deputy chairman of Power Financial Corporation. In May 2008, he was also appointed deputy chairman of Power Corporation of Canada and became executive co-chairman of Power Financial Corporation.

He had started and owned an experimental farm in Canada, as of 2018, when he was running Power Corp. with his brother Paul Jr., which at the time controlled companies such as Great-West Lifeco Inc. and IGM Financial Inc. They both stepped down to board positions in 2019. They had run the company together for 25 years.

In 2020, after 24 years as co-chief executive officer of Power Corporation, Desmarais retired from this role. He continues to play an active role in the governance of Power Corporation and maintains his position as deputy chairman of the board.

The Desmarais family invested in Rockefeller Capital Management in April 2023, providing $622 million from IGM Financial Inc. in exchange for a 20.5% stake and two board seats. IGM had reportedly approached Rockefeller a year earlier, beginning discussions in the fall, with IGM selling Investment Planning Counsel to Canada Life to help fund the purchase.

== Board memberships ==
- Deputy Chairman: Power Corporation and Power Financial
- Great-West Lifeco Inc.
- Canada Life
- Empower Retirement
- Putnam Investments
- IGM Financial Inc.
- IG Wealth Management
- Mackenzie
- Power Sustainable
- Vice-chairman: Pargesa Holding SA

== Professional memberships ==
- Honorary Chairman of the Canada China Business Council
- Member of The Trilateral Commission
- Member of the Chairman's International Advisory Council of the Americas Society
- Member of several China-based organizations

== Past engagements ==
Member of the Hong Kong Chief Executive's Council of International Advisers from 1998 to 2007.

Appointed in 2003 to the international council of the JP Morgan Chase Bank until 2010.

== Honours ==
- 2003: Named an officer of the Order of Canada

- 2009: Made an Officer of the National Order of Quebec

- Doctorate honoris causa from Concordia University, Université de Montréal and McGill University

- President of the honorary members – lieutenant-colonel of the Voltigeurs de Québec.

== Personal life ==
He married France Chrétien Desmarais, the daughter of former Prime Minister of Canada Jean Chrétien, on May 23, 1981. They have four children.

In August 2016, The Wall Street Journal mentions that André Desmarais and his brother Paul Jr. "are readying their 34-year-old sons (Olivier Desmarais and Paul Desmarais III) to take over Power Corp".

== Philanthropy ==
Desmarais has played key roles in a number of fundraising campaigns, including those of the Montreal Museum of Fine Arts, the Montreal Heart Institute, the Montreal General Hospital, Leucan, the Canadian Red Cross, the Canadian Cancer Society (The Daffodil Ball), Centraide of Greater Montreal and the Jean Paul Riopelle Foundation.

In November 2015, André Desmarais and his wife donated 3 million Canadian dollars to the Montreal Heart Institute.

Desmarais is also chairman of the Foundation Baxter & Alma Ricard.
