= GOVA =

Public transit agency in Greater Sudbury, Ontario, Canada

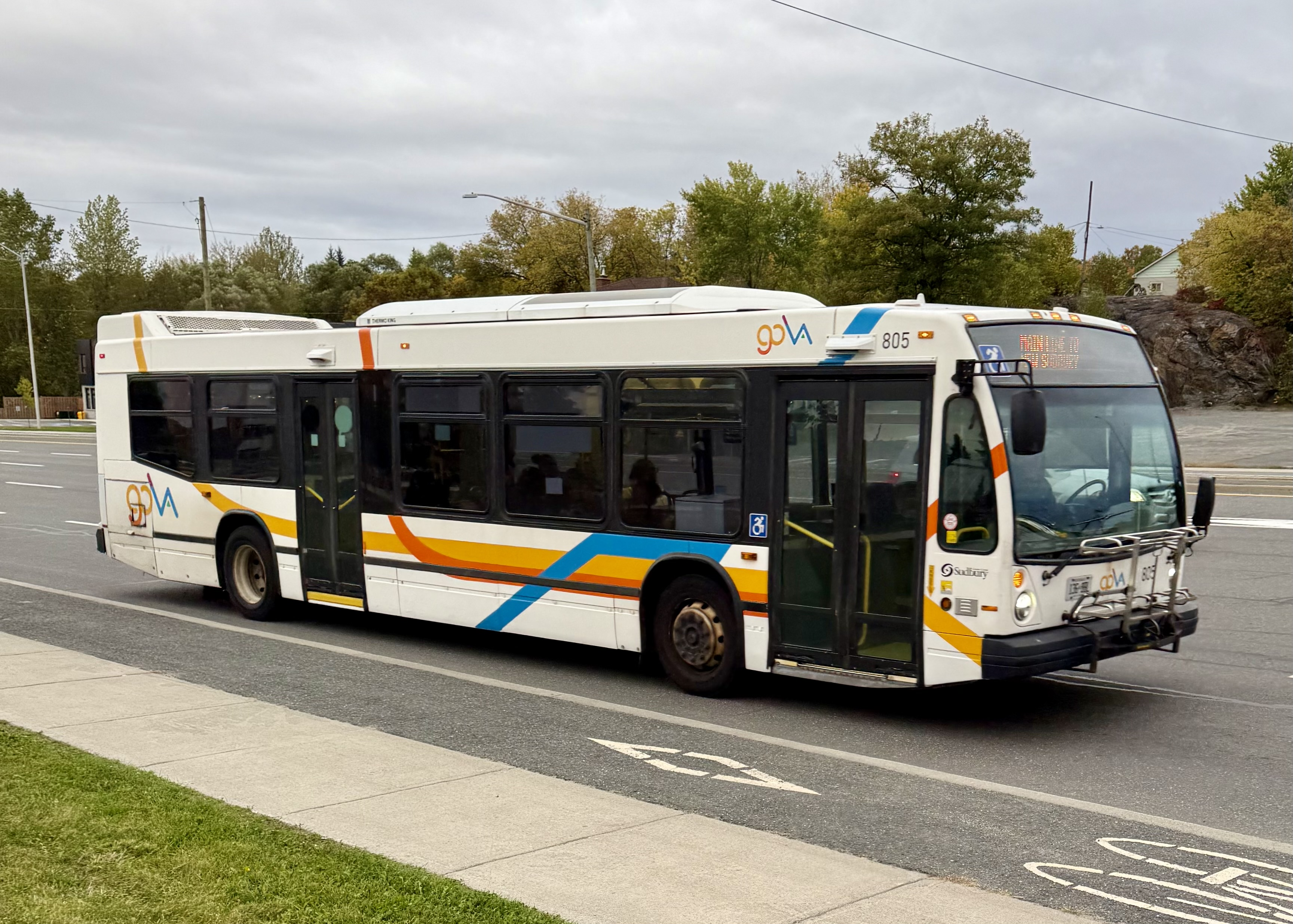
- Bus 805 on Notre Dame Avenue
- Founded: 1972 (as Sudbury Transit); 2000 (as Greater Sudbury Transit); 2019 (relaunched as GOVA)
- Headquarters: 200 Brady Street
- Locale: City of Greater Sudbury
- Service area: Azilda, Blezard Valley, Capreol, Chelmsford, Coniston, Copper Cliff, Downtown Sudbury, Elmview, Falconbridge, Garson, Hanmer, Laurentian University, Lively, Minnow Lake, New Sudbury, Val Caron, Val Thérèse.
- Service type: Bus service, Paratransit
- Routes: 25
- Stops: 1,098
- Depots: City of Greater Sudbury Transit and Fleet Centre, 1160 Lorne St, Sudbury, ON
- Fleet: 59 Novabus LFS Buses
- Daily ridership: 15,000 - 25,000
- Annual ridership: 6.200,000 (2024)
- Operator: Growth & Development Dept.
- Website: https://www.greatersudbury.ca/gova

GOVA, formerly known as Greater Sudbury Transit, is a public transport authority that is responsible for serving bus routes in Greater Sudbury, Ontario, Canada and area. The network is the largest in Northern Ontario, comprising 25 routes operating between the hours of 5:30am to 1:00am the next day. The annual ridership for the year of 2024 was recorded at 6.2 million passengers.

The service rebranded as GOVA in August 2019. The new name was selected to work bilingually, by pairing the English verb "go" with its French equivalent "va".

== Overview ==
Greater Sudbury Transit features 59 buses on 25 routes servicing the city centre and outlying neighbourhoods such as Capreol, Chelmsford, Lively and Falconbridge. GOVA saw a record breaking 6.2 million rides in 2024. GOVA Transit also provides door-to-door services for persons with physical disabilities known as GOVA Plus.

The bus fleet consists entirely of low-floor 40' NovaBus LFS.

== History ==
Transit services in Sudbury began with the Sudbury & Copper Cliff Suburban Electric Railway (11 November 1915 - Fall 1951). The SCCSER acquired a secondary system, City Bus Lines (1947–1950), in 1950. In the fall of 1951, the company reorganized as Sudbury Bus Lines Limited (1951–1966). This later became an umbrella corporation, Laurentian Transit (Sudbury) Limited (1966–1972), for the joint operation of transit in Sudbury by Nickel Belt Coach Lines, Local Lines Limited, and DeLongchamp Cartage Company. Until 1972 the system was privately operated, but in that year it was taken over by the City of Sudbury Community Services Department under the name of Sudbury Transit (1972–2000). Sudbury Transit served an area population of 92,000 with a vehicle fleet of 33 buses and employed 103 workers (1991).

The original Sudbury Transit logo was designed by designer Stuart Ash in 1972. The agency later used the municipal logo of Greater Sudbury on its vehicles rather than a distinct transit-specific logo.

Sudbury Transit logo, 1972

The transit system in and around Sudbury today was formed in 2000 during the amalgamation of the cities and towns of the Regional Municipality of Sudbury by combining the existing Sudbury bus service with the surrounding commuter bus lines of Rayside-Balfour, Valley East, and Walden. Thus, Greater Sudbury Transit has an enormous service area for its fleet.

In 2006, Greater Sudbury Transit introduced five 40' coach-style buses from Nova Bus into its fleet. These buses service the city's longest routes, such as routes 701-Lively, 702-Azilda/Chelmsford, and 703-Val Caron/Hanmer/Capreol, providing increased comfort for those riders travelling long distances. These buses, which are described as having a "suburban-style interior", luggage racks, LED reading lights above each seat, and comfortable bucket seats with added cushioning.

As of December 1, 2009, Greater Sudbury Transit buses feature a fully operational audio/visual stop announcement system for passengers who are hearing and/or visually impaired. The stop announcement system also helps non-disabled passengers who are not familiar with a bus route of the transit system if they are not sure where it is they need to get off at to reach their destination.

As of August 2010, the Greater Sudbury Transit bus fleet is compromised entirely of low floor "wheelchair accessible" buses - making Greater Sudbury Transit the first transit authority in all of Ontario to have an "Easier Access" bus fleet.

Before rebranding as GOVA, most routes met at the Transit Centre in downtown Sudbury (the 103-Coniston and 303-Garson/Falconbridge departed from the New Sudbury Centre Monday to Saturday), and service was provided from 6:15 am to 12:30 am 7 days a week, 363 days a year. Bus service was limited to 6:15 pm on Christmas Eve. There is no bus service on Christmas Day. Private charters can also be arranged.

Greater Sudbury Transit also operated a trans-cab service for any outlying area which does not receive bus service (including Long Lake, Richard Lake, Radar Base, Skead, Wahnapitae, Whitefish and Dowling) which provides a taxi from the individual's home to a transit bus stop. Currently this service is branded as GOVA Zone.

As of April 12, 2012, Greater Sudbury Transit guaranteed seven bus routes (101, 182, 301, 501, 701, 702, 703) that would always be equipped with bike racks. Cyclists wishing to bring their bikes on other routes are permitted to bring their bike on-board according to the driver's discretion (e.g. not during rush-hour etc.). City staff have indicated that following the construction to the new transit garage there will theoretically be sufficient space within to equip the whole fleet with bike racks. There is not enough space within the current garage to accommodate the additional 0.8 m required per bus with a bike rack.

== GOVA Rebranding ==
In 2018, it was announced that the City of Greater Sudbury had created a $99 million transit stimulus fund to be spent over a period of 10 years, $72 million of which was contributed by the federal and provincial governments, with the remainder being contributed by the city itself. Some ideas which were considered included a switch to electric buses, improvements to cycling-transit integration, adoption of "smart" fare card technology, and a renewal of the existing diesel bus fleet.

In February 2019, major changes were announced for the service to be supported by the $99 million fund, which would see the creation of a new bus routes, more frequent service, more early morning service, fare reductions, and a restructuring of the entire local transit system around three major hubs, rather than the single Downtown terminal. These hubs would include the existing terminal as well as one in New Sudbury and another at the south end of the city.

In 2019, the service rebranded as GOVA. Alongside the rebranding, routes were reorganized to increase efficiency of travel; instead of the former model where all bus routes travelled to and from downtown, the new model features a number of selected high-frequency bus lines along major arterial routes, paired with one-way collector buses that interchange with the high-frequency routes at one of several new transit hubs in the city.

=== Past names ===
- Sudbury & Copper Cliff Suburban Electric Railway (1915–1951)
- Sudbury Bus Lines, Ltd. (1951–1966)
- Laurentian Transit (Sudbury) Ltd. (1966–1972)
- Sudbury Transit (Sudbury) Ltd. (1972–2000)
- Greater Sudbury Transit (2000–2019)

== Fixed Routes ==
Number	Name	Termini	Headway	Notes
1N	Mainline New Sudbury	Downtown Transit Hub <> New Sudbury Transit Hub	15-30 | All Day	
1S	Mainline South End	Downtown Transit Hub <> South End Transit Hub	15-30 | All Day	
2	Barrydowne - Cambrian	Downtown Transit Hub <> Cambrian College	15-45 | All Day	
3	Laurentian via Regent	Downtown Transit Hub <> Laurentian University	30-60 | All Day	
4	Laurentian via Paris	Downtown Transit Hub <> Laurentian University	30 | Peak Only	Operates from September to April
10	Minnow Lake	Downtown Transit Hub <> Moonlight	30-60 | All Day	Extended to Moonlight Beach from June to August
11	Donovan - Collège Boréal	Downtown Transit Hub <> New Sudbury Transit Hub	15-60 | All Day	Extended to Cambrian College from September to April
12	Second Avenue	Downtown Transit Hub <> New Sudbury Transit Hub	30-60 | All Day	
13	Copper Cliff	Downtown Transit Hub <> Copper Cliff	30-60 | All Day	
14	Four Corners	Downtown Transit Hub <> South End Transit Hub	30-60 | All Day	
20	Graywood - Madison Local	Loop via New Sudbury Transit Hub	30-60 | All Day	
22	Grandview Local	Loop via New Sudbury Transit Hub	2h | Off-Peak Only	
23	New Sudbury Local	Loop via New Sudbury Transit Hub	2h | Off-Peak Only	
24	Cambrian Heights Local	Loop via Downtown Transit Hub	30-60 | All Day	
25	West End Local	Loop via Downtown Transit Hub	30-60 | All Day	
26	McKim Local	Loop via Downtown Transit Hub	30-60 | All Day	
27	Flour Mill Local	Loop via Downtown Transit Hub	30-60 | All Day	
28	South End Local	Loop via South End Transit Hub	30-60 | All Day	
29	Martindale Local	Loop via South End Transit Hub	1h | Off-Peak Only	
101	Lively	Downtown Transit Hub <> Naughton Mobility Hub	1h-2h | All Day	
102	Garson	New Sudbury Transit Hub <> Garson Mobility Hub	45-90 | All Day	
103	Coniston	New Sudbury Transit Hub <> Coniston Mobility Hub	45-90 | All Day	
104	Azilda - Chelmsford	Downtown Transit Hub <> Chelmsford Mobility Hub	30-90 | All Day	
105	Valley - Capreol	Downtown Transit Hub <> Capreol	30-2h| All Day	
106	Valley - Dominion	Downtown Transit Hub <> Hanmer Mall	75 | Peak Only	
B	Chelmsford - Levack	Chelmsford Mobility Hub <> Levack	2-4 trips per day	Fixed route service via GOVA Zone B
D	Garson - Falconbridge	Garson Mobility Hub <> Falconbridge	2-4 trips per day	Fixed route service via GOVA Zone D

== See also ==
- Public transport in Canada
