= France Chrétien Desmarais =

Canadian lawyer and businessman

France Chrétien Desmarais CM
- Born: July 5, 1958 (age 67); Quebec, Canada
- Occupations: Lawyer; businesswoman
- Spouse: André Desmarais
- Children: 4, including Olivier
- Parent(s): Jean Chrétien; Aline Chaîné

France Chrétien Desmarais CM (born July 5, 1958) is a Canadian lawyer and businesswoman. She is the daughter of Jean Chrétien, 20th prime minister of Canada.

== Biography ==
Chrétien Desmarais is married to André Desmarais, president of the Montreal-based Power Corporation of Canada, and son of Paul Desmarais, a wealthy businessman. They have four children. One daughter, Jacqueline-Ariadne Desmarais, (b. January 23, 1990, Toronto, Ontario, Canada), married September 7, 2013, in Montreal, Quebec, Canada, Prince Hadrien Étienne Georges André Aldo de Croÿ-Rœulx (b. September 9, 1983, Uccle, Brussels, Belgium). The direct descendant of Anne Emmanuel de Croÿ, the 8th Duke of Croÿ of the Solre.

Chrétien Desmarais and her husband donated money to build one of the tallest buildings on the University of Ottawa Campus. She was chair of the board of the Montreal Heart Institute Foundation and a graduate of the University of Ottawa. She is also currently chair of the Canadian Olympic Foundation as well as vice-chair of the One Drop Foundation.

In 2011, Chrétien Desmarais was made a Member of the Order of Canada.
