= Desmarais et Cie =

19th century Montreal photo studio

L.E. Desmarais et Cie, known in English as L.E. Desmarais & Company, was a photo studio active in Montreal, Quebec during the 19th century. The company was run by Louis-Élie and Ovila Desmarais. From 1864 to 1868, the company operated a studio at 17 boulevard Saint Laurent in Montreal.

Photographs by the Desmarais' are included in the collection of the Musée national des beaux-arts du Québec.
