= Montreal Heart Institute Foundation =

Canadian non-profit organization

- Fondation de l’Institut de Cardiologie de Montréal
- Formation: 1977
- Type: nonprofit institution
- Legal status: Foundation
- Headquarters: Montreal, Quebec
- Region served: Canada
- President: Alain Gignac
- Affiliations: Montreal Heart Institute
- Website: fondationicm.org/en/

The Montreal Heart Institute Foundation (French: Fondation de l’Institut de Cardiologie de Montréal) is a non-profit group associated with Montreal Heart Institute, in Montreal, Quebec, which aims to raise and administer funds to support the research, teaching, care, and prioritize the innovative cardiovascular research projects.

Alain Gignac is the president and CEO of the MHIF.

== See also ==
- Montreal Heart Institute
