= Lakefield College School =

Coordinates: 44.440°N 78.265°W

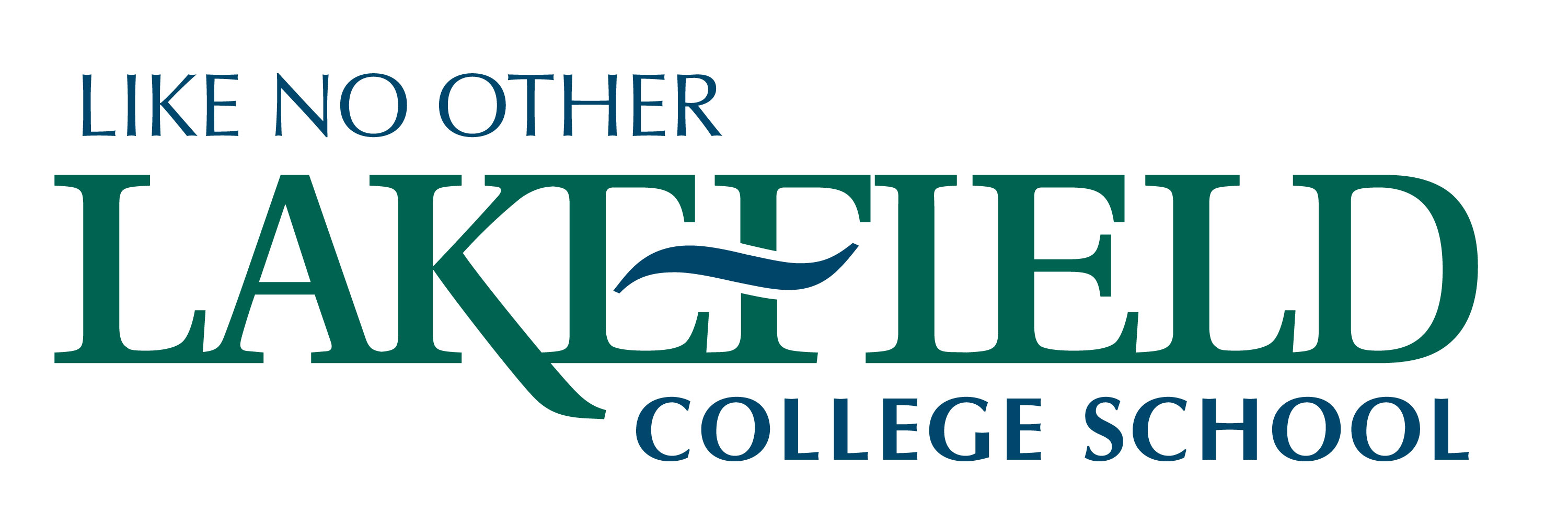

Location
- 4391 County Road 29; Lakefield, Ontario, K0L 2H0; Canada

Information
- School type: Private, Coeducational, Boarding, Day Students Grades 9 - 12
- Motto: Mens sana in corpore sano
- Religious affiliation: Anglican Church of Canada
- Established: 1879
- Head of school: Anne-Marie Kee
- Enrolment: 430
- Campus: Waterfront Campus (155-acre (0.63 km^{2}), rural), Northcote Campus (160-acre (0.65 km^{2}), rural)
- Colours: Red and Green
- Mascot: Terrapin
- Tuition: $40,500 (day) $73,500 (boarding) $82,400 (international boarding)
- Website: www.lcs.on.ca

Lakefield College School (sometimes called LCS, The Grove or simply Lakefield) is a private day and boarding school located north of the village of Lakefield, Ontario. It was the first Canadian member of Round Square, an international affiliation of schools.

== History ==
LCS was founded in 1879 by Sam Strickland and Col. Sparham Sheldrake (in Strickland's home, called Grove House). It was originally named Sparham Sheldrake's Preparatory School for Boys and was located on 25 acres (10 ha) of land with a large farmhouse, a shed, and a kitchen; with enough room to accommodate about 15 boys.

In 1895 Reverend Alexander Mackenzie, then a teacher at the school, became Headmaster and bought the school from Col. Sheldrake. He built the school chapel (in 1924) and established the school's educational philosophy of combining a rigorous academic curriculum with a full program of sports, arts and outdoor education. During his time at the school, new classrooms, dormitories and dining room were added. His son Kenneth became the school's third Headmaster — a position he held until joining the Royal Canadian Navy two years later; he died in a car crash in 1966.

In 1940, Gordon Winder Smith, was appointed Headmaster. The school was faced with a mounting debt, buildings in poor condition and very little property surrounding the school. Working with the school's Board of Governors, Winder Smith. or "Boodie" as he was known, was able to retire the debt. He then embarked on a program of upgrading the facilities and adding new buildings and residences. Following the Second World War the name was changed to Lakefield Preparatory School. In May 1959, the school's new classroom building was visited by Governor-General Vincent Massey. In 1964, Mr. Smith retired and Winder Smith Dining Hall was named in his honour.

Jack Eastwood Matthews was appointed as the next Headmaster and over the next seven years the school expanded in numbers and in international reputation. (Matthews went on to found Lester B. Pearson College in British Columbia.) In May 1965, Lt.-Gov. Earl Rowe visited and officially opened Winder-Smith Hall and in September, Premier John Robarts officially opened Colebrook House.

On January 1, 1966, Lakefield Preparatory School was renamed Lakefield College School. In 1969, Prince Philip, Duke of Edinburgh, visited and presented Gold, Silver, and Bronze Awards. In 1970, the funds for a new theatre and classroom building were donated and construction began. It was called the McLaughlin-Osler Centre and was opened by former Old Boy, Teacher and then Peterborough MP Hugh Faulkner. The next Headmaster, John Terry M. Guest was appointed in 1971, and Ashelworth House and property surrounding the school was purchased.

In 1977, Prince Andrew (later Duke of York, now Andrew Mountbatten Windsor) attended the school for a term as an exchange student from Gordonstoun School, Scotland. The school became the first Canadian member of the Round Square Conference of Schools, an international association of schools with similar values and beliefs.

In 1979, the school celebrated its centennial.

In 1985, David Hadden took over as Headmaster, initiating major changes. Although there was much debate among its alumni, Board of Governors, and trustees, LCS became co-educational in response to changing times and enrollment. In 1989, the first female students were accepted to LCS. Under Hadden's headship, the old chapel was replaced (1997), an artificial outdoor ice hockey rink was constructed (2005) in memory of Bob Armstrong, the Northcote campus was added (2007) and construction on a $12.5 million Student Recreation Centre was begun (2007).

In early 2008, David Thompson, the Principal of Greenwood College School and LCS trustee, was appointed as Hadden's successor. In 2008, the new student recreation centre, with a gymnasium, outdoor education classrooms, and student common areas was officially opened and named Hadden Hall.

David Thompson resigned as Head of School, effective June 30, 2010, and Sarah McMahon was appointed Interim Head of School, effective August 1, 2010. Struan Robertson joined LCS as Head of School in March 2012. Robertson resigned as Head of School, effective June 30, 2016, and Guy McLean was appointed Interim Head of School, effective August 1, 2016.

In August 2017, Anne-Marie Kee joined Lakefield College School as its 12th Head of School and Head of LCS Foundation.

Lakefield College School had the volunteer support of Prince Andrew. The Duke's term as honorary chair and trustee of the Lakefield College School Foundation expired in 2019 and he is no longer associated with the school.

== Campus ==
LCS has a 315-acre (1.27 km^{2}) wooded, waterfront, campus on the east shore of Lake Katchewanooka in rural Ontario. It is just north of the village of Lakefield, an hour and a half drive north-east from Toronto, Ontario.

It contains twelve boarding houses, with an average of just over 20 students per house. The main building contains a dining hall, modern theatre, music room, art room, day student locker rooms, science labs, large library, and classrooms.

An outdoor artificial ice surface, The Bob Armstrong Rink, has been operational since November 2005. A boathouse at the waterfront contains sailboats, kayaks, and canoes. Other buildings contain the dance studio and weight room. There is also a chapel which is affiliated with the Anglican Diocese of Toronto.

160 acres (0.65 km^{2}) of land (formerly owned by the Gastle family) was donated to LCS by the Ross family. The 'Northcote' campus officially became part of the LCS community on October 27, 2007.

In October 2008, Lakefield College School opened a new student recreation centre, named Hadden Hall in honour of David and Susan Hadden's 23 years at the school. The facility includes a gymnasium, outdoor education wing, indoor climbing wall, dance studio, exercise facility, and several common areas for students. The east wing of the hall was named the Paul and Hélène Demarais Family Outdoor Education Wing, and the gymnasium was named for The McEwen Family. This new building is the school's first LEED gold-certified building.

Construction on LCS's second LEED gold-certified building, the Cooper House residence, was complete for Fall 2009 and Uplands, was completed in Summer 2015, officially opened in October 2015.

The school's most recent residences, Ross House and Parent Houses were officially opened on October 1, 2022. The new houses are named in honour of the Ross Family and Parent Family in recognition of their dedication and commitment to the LCS community and the leadership-level philanthropic support that made this important project possible.

== Students ==
As of 2023, LCS enrolls 430 students (grades 9–12); 295 boarding and 135 day students.

The boarding students live in twelve residential houses (Grove, Ondaatje, Memorial, Rashleigh, Colebrook, Moodie, Matthews, Ryder, Cooper, Uplands, Ross, Parent), each with an adult 'Head of House' who acts as a parent and an 'Assistant Head of House' who acts like an older brother or sister while the student is away from home. There are six boys' boarding houses and six girls' boarding houses. The houses contain student dormitories, washrooms, common areas, a Head of House residence, and an Assistant Head of House apartment. Each has an average of 23 students and two adults. As of 2020, each day student is affiliated with a boarding house and takes part in the life and activities of that house.

There are also four competitive "spirit" houses: Lefevre, Mackenzie, Pullen, and Sheldrake. Initially there were two houses, Red and Green, but these were divided in the 1950s into the four that exist today. The initial colour schemes for each house were: Lefevre, green and silver; Mackenzie, blue and red; Pullen, blue and yellow; Sheldrake, black and gold. These colour schemes have since been changed to each house having one colour; Lefevre, white; Mackenzie, red; Pullen, blue; Sheldrake, green.

Each student has an academic advisor who assists with all facets of the student's career at LCS (e.g., arranging extra help, including tutoring), and also a guidance counsellor who helps with course selection and university admission.

== Faculty sexual misconduct ==
In 2015, an independent investigation found that Anglican pastor Keith Gleed (1932–2001), who worked at the school from 1974 to 1980, sexually abused young boys enrolled at Lakefield.

== LCS in the news ==
- The School has announced that alumnus John and Jane Hepburn made a $15 million commitment toward the school's new dining hall and other strategic priorities. The Hepburn's gift represents one of the largest single donations ever made to an independent school in Canada.

== Notable alumni ==
- Andrew Mountbatten-Windsor, former prince and Duke of York, member of the Royal Family (1978)
- Felipe VI, King of Spain, member of the Spanish Royal Family (1984-1985)
- Emilio Azcárraga Jean, CEO of Televisa, the largest media company in the Spanish-speaking world
- Will Arnett, actor best known for playing Gob Bluth in Arrested Development
- Sebastian Bach, musician and frontman, Skid Row (American Band)
- Ian Binnie, Justice of the Supreme Court of Canada, Served from 1998 to 2011
- Ted Byfield, Western Canadian writer, publisher
- Cody Ceci, hockey player
- Paul Desmarais, Jr., chairman and co-CEO of Power Corporation of Canada
- Greg Douglas, Olympian (sailing)
- Sarah Douglas, Olympian (sailing)
- Erin Freeland Ballantyne, Rhodes Scholar, pioneer in transformation education in the north
- Matt Frewer, actor
- Anna Gainey, MP and Cabinet minister
- Colin Harper aka Collie Buddz, musician
- James R.M. Harris, former leader of the Green Party of Canada
- Barclay Hope, actor
- Gord Hunter, Nepean/Ottawa city councillor, 1980–2010
- Trevor Jones, Olympian (rowing)
- Michael Kulas, musician, James
- Duncan McCue, Canadian television and radio journalist for the Canadian Broadcasting Corporation
- David Miller, mayor of Toronto from 2003 to 2010
- Meghan Roach, CEO of Roots Corporation from 2020 to present
- Nick Wright, founding leader of the Green Party of Nova Scotia

== See also ==
- List of Canadian organizations with royal patronage
