= Canada China Business Council =

Non-profit business association

- Founded: 1978
- Purpose: International Trade
- Location: Toronto, Ontario, Canada
- Region served: Global
- Services: Government advocacy, event organization, trade missions, research, publishing
- Key people: Olivier Desmarais, Chair Graham Shantz, President Bijan Ahmadi, Executive Director
- Employees: 17
- Website: ccbc.com

The Canada China Business Council, or CCBC (French: Conseil d'affaires Canada-Chine; Chinese: 加中贸易理事会), is a private, non-profit business association founded in 1978 to facilitate and promote business, trade, and investment between Canada and the People's Republic of China. CCBC has offices in Toronto, Vancouver, Montreal, Calgary, Halifax, Beijing, and Shanghai. CCBC is the de facto Canadian chamber of commerce in Beijing. It also has business incubators in Beijing, Shanghai, Montreal, and Calgary to help Canadian companies grow in China and Chinese investors succeed in Canada.

== Mandate ==
- Stimulate growth in bilateral business, trade, and investment in goods and services;
- Promote closer bilateral relations between Canada and China;
- Provide practical and focused business advice and services to members;
- Be the voice of the Canadian business community on matters pertaining to Canada-China relations at all levels of government and to the general public in both countries.

== Events ==
CCBC hosts various events such as trade missions and delegations, conferences, roundtables, and seminars throughout the year. It also organizes business and networking events on behalf of its members. Notable past events include the state visit to China by Governor General David Johnston in 2013, visit by Prime Minister Stephen Harper in 2012, and China's Commerce Minister CHEN Deming's visit to Canada in 2012. Other events include:

- CCBC Annual General Meeting and Policy Conference
- Canada-China Business Forum
- CCBC China Business Workshops
- CCBC Great Canadian Christmas Party
- CCBC Canadian Charity Ball
- Canada Day celebrations

== Publications ==
CCBC publishes its annual magazine, the Canada-China Business Forum Magazine". The magazine covers topics relevant to Canada-China business, trade, and investment. Business leaders, public officials, and academics familiar with Canada-China relations contribute to the magazine. The most recent edition was published in August 2016.

== Advocacy and awards ==
CCBC advocates for stronger bilateral ties between Canada and China and for a better business environment in each country. Memembers of both countries' government and institutions are the target of this advocacy action. The Government of Alberta signed an externship agreement with the CCBC in 2012 to allow young Albertans to gain valuable work experience in China. CCBC also recognizes companies that have demonstrated business excellence and leadership in China and Canada. In 2012, the CCBC presented its biennial China-Canada Business Excellence Awards to:

- Hatch for CCBC Member of the Year
- Epic Data International for Outstanding SME
- Huawei for Investment in Canada
- Ivey Business School for Education Excellence

== Structure ==
The CCBC is a private, non-partisan, membership-based business association with members from both Canada and China. Members include large multinational corporations such as AtkinsRéalis, Barrick Gold, BlackBerry, Bombardier, BMO Financial Group, Caisse de Depot, CITIC, Export Development Canada, Huawei Technologies, Manulife Financial, Molycorp, Power Corporation and Sun Life Financial. The CCBC draws its members from different industries, including manufacturing, oil and gas, education, the public sector, and professional services. The CCBC works closely with the China Council for Promotion of International Trade(CCPIT).
