= Paul Desmarais Jr. =

Canadian businessman (born 1954)

Paul Desmarais Jr. OC OQ
- Born: 3 July 1954 (age 71); Sudbury, Ontario, Canada
- Education: Lakefield College School ('73); McGill University (BComm 1977); INSEAD (MBA 1979)
- Spouse: Hélène Blouin (m. 1979)
- Children: Paul Desmarais III
- Parent(s): Paul Desmarais Sr. Jacqueline Maranger
- Relatives: André Desmarais (brother)

Paul Guy Desmarais Jr. OC OQ (born 3 July 1954) is a Canadian businessman and philanthropist. He is the chairman of Power Corporation of Canada.

== Early life and education ==
Paul Desmarais Jr. was born in Sudbury, Ontario. He was raised Roman Catholic. He is the eldest son of billionaire Paul Desmarais Sr. and Jacqueline Desmarais.

He was educated at Lakefield College School in Lakefield, Ontario and later attended McGill University. Afterwards, he earned a Master of Business Administration degree at INSEAD.

== Career ==
Desmarais began his career with S.G. Warburg & Co. in London, England, and with Standard Brands Incorporated in New York. He then joined Power Corporation of Canada in 1981 and assumed the position of Vice-President the following year. In 1984, he led the creation of Power Financial Corporation, where he served as Vice-President from 1984 to 1986, as President and Chief Operating Officer from 1986 to 1989, as Executive Vice Chairman from 1989 to 1990, as Executive Chairman from 1990 to 2005, as Chairman of the Executive Committee from 2006 to 2008, as Executive Co-Chairman from 2008 to 2020, and as Chairman since 2020.

He also served as vice-chairman of Power Corporation from 1991 to 1996. He was named chairman and co-CEO of Power Corporation in 1996. On February 13, 2020, Desmarais retired from the functions of co-CEO and as of 2021 continued to play an active role in the governance of Power Corporation as chairman of its board of directors.

In August 2016, The Wall Street Journal stated that Desmarais and his brother André were "readying their 34-year-old sons (Paul Desmarais III and Olivier Desmarais) to take over Power Corp".

In April 2020, Paul and André Desmarais received more than $2.8 million each for stepping down as co-chief executive officers.

== Board memberships ==
- Chairman: Power Corporation and Power Financial
- Great-West Lifeco Inc.
- Canada Life
- Empower Retirement
- Putnam Investments
- IGM Financial Inc.
- IG Wealth Management
- Mackenzie
- Pargesa Holding SA
- Chairman: Groupe Bruxelles Lambert
- SGS

He was vice-chairman of the board and a director of Imerys (France) from 1998 until 2008; a director of GDF Suez (France) from 2008 until 2014; and a director of Total until 2017.

He is chairman of the board of governors of the International Economic Forum of the Americas (Canada), which holds four annual conferences, including the Conference of Montreal, as well as member of The Business Council of Canada and The Business Council (United States). Desmarais is also a trustee of the Brookings Institution, co-chair of the Brookings International Advisory Council and a member of the Brookings Executive Committee. He is a member of the Global Board of Advisors of the Council on Foreign Relations (United States).

He is a member of the Global Advisory Council of Harvard.

== Philanthropic activities ==
Desmarais is involved with Centraide of Greater Montréal; he founded the Major Donors Circle in 1997 and had been its Honorary Chairman for many years, until 2017. He received the 2018 Michèle Thibodeau-DeGuire Award and became the first Governor Emeritus for his contribution and support in the fight against poverty and social exclusion. He is also one of the honorary chairs of the "Healing More Better" campaign of the CHU Sainte-Justine Foundation.

In 2014 Desmarais participated in a ski expedition to the North Magnetic Pole, organized by True Patriot Love, Canada's largest charity supporting military families. The goal of the expedition was to raise awareness of the physical and mental injuries that continue to impact Canadian soldiers.

Desmarais was co-chair of "A Force of Nature", a national campaign of Nature Conservancy Canada from April 1, 2007 to December 31, 2012. The national campaign raised more than $500 million and protected 752,000 acres (300,000 hectares) of at-risk natural habitat across Canada, home to more than 145 species at risk.

== Personal life ==
Desmarais is married to Hélène Desmarais, chairman of the board and CEO of the Centre d'entreprises et d'innovation de Montréal (CEIM).

== Honors ==
- In 1992, he received the 125th Anniversary of the Confederation of Canada Medal
- In 1994, he received the 'Insigne d'Officier de l'Ordre de la Couronne' in Belgium
- In 2002, he received the Queen Elizabeth II Golden Jubilee Medal
- In 2005, he was made an Officer of the Order of Canada
- In 2005, he received the Executive of the Year Award from the Academy of International Business
- In 2005, he was honored by the Board of Trade of Metropolitan Montreal as a Great Montrealer
- In 2006, he received a Doctorat Honoris Causa from the Université Laval
- In 2008, he received a Doctorat Honoris Causa from the Université de Montréal
- In 2009, he was made an Officer of the National Order of Quebec
- In 2012, he received the Queen Elizabeth II Diamond Jubilee Medal and was named Chevalier de la Légion d'honneur in France
- In 2017, he was named Governor Emeritus of Centraide
- In 2018, he received the Michèle Thibodeau-DeGuire Award for his outstanding contribution to Centraide
- In 2018, he received the Outstanding Philanthropist Award from the Association of Fundraiser Professionals
- In 2019, he received an honorary degree from the University of Manitoba
- In 2019, he received an honorary degree from McMaster University
