= Hélène Desmarais =

Canadian businessperson

Hélène L. (nee Blouin) Desmarais CM OQ
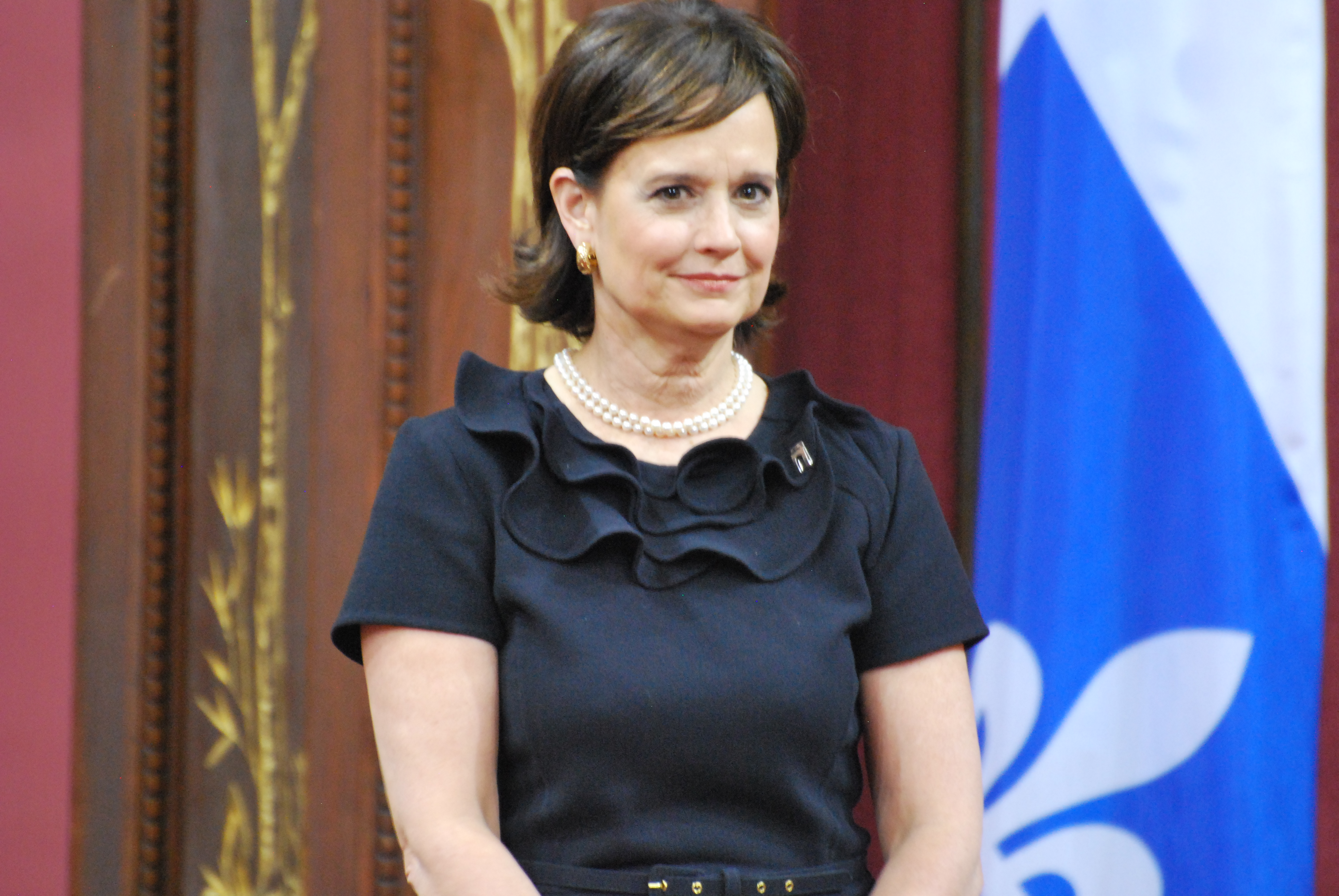
- Desmarais in June 2013
- Education: HEC Montréal
- Occupation: Businesswoman
- Spouse: Paul Desmarais Jr.

Hélène Desmarais CM OQ is a Canadian businesswoman and is a member of a number of boards and committees in the public and private sectors, including president of the board of directors of HEC Montréal.

== Life ==
Desmarais is a graduate of business administration from HEC Montréal. She also studied at Sciences Po in Paris, studied art history at Christie's in London and history of architecture at the New York School of Design.

Desmarais has contributed to developing technology companies since 1996 as the founder, chair of the board and chief executive officer of the Montréal Centre for Enterprise and Innovation (CEIM), the first technology incubator and consulting service of its kind.

Desmarais chaired a provincial committee to study the healthcare industry (1997), was made a member of the board of HEC Montréal in 1999 and became its chair in 2003. Desmarais also chairs the Université de Montréal's Faculty of Medicine Advisory Committee (from 2006), and sits on the boards of Christian Dior SA (from 2012), Garda World Security (2006), and Génome Québec (2002) and was governor of the International Economic Forum of the Americas. In 2009, she was appointed by Health Minister Yves Bolduc to the board of directors of the Centre hospitalier de l'Université de Montréal (CHUM), one of the largest hospitals in Canada.

In 2010 she was awarded the Order of Canada and was named to the Académie des Grands Montréalais. In June 2013 she received the title of Officer of the Ordre national du Québec.

== Distinctions ==
- 2002 Golden Jubilee Medal
- 2007 Order of Merit, Université de Montréal
- 2009 Honorary Doctorate, Université Lumière Lyon 2
- 2009 Honorary Doctorate, St Francis Xavier University
- 2009 Medal of Honour, Université de Montréal's Faculty of Medicine
- 2010 Member of the Order of Canada
- 2010 Grands Montréalais, Chambre de commerce du Montréal Métropolitain
- 2010 Prix entrepreneurship of Conseil du Patronat du Québec
- 2012 Golden Jubilee Medal
- 2013 Officer of l'Ordre national du Québec
- 2016 Commander of the Order of Montreal
