= Paul Desmarais =

Canadian businessman

The Honourable Paul Desmarais PC CC OQ
- Born: 4 January 1927; Sudbury, Ontario, Canada
- Died: 8 October 2013 (aged 86); Sagard, Quebec, Canada
- Education: University of Ottawa (BComm 1949)
- Spouse: Jacqueline Maranger (m. 1953)
- Children: 4, including Paul Desmarais Jr. and André Desmarais

Paul Guy Desmarais Sr. PC CC OQ (4 January 1927 – 8 October 2013) was a Canadian financier and philanthropist, based in Montreal. With an estimated family net worth of US$4.5 billion (as of March 2012), Desmarais was ranked by Forbes as the fourth wealthiest person in Canada, and 235th in the world in 2013. He was chairman and chief executive officer of Power Corporation of Canada until 1996, when he passed the reins of management of Power Corporation to his sons, Paul Jr. and André. He continued as a director and as chairman of the executive committee of the board, and remained the controlling shareholder. Power Corporation of Canada is a diversified international management and holding company with interests in companies in the financial services, asset management, sustainable and renewable energy, and other business sectors.

Desmarais was highly regarded for his standard of integrity and his commitment to a united and prosperous Canada.

== Personal life ==
Desmarais was born in Sudbury, Ontario, to lawyer Jean-Noël Desmarais (3 May 1897 – 1983) and Lébéa Laforest (2 September 1899 – 1984). The Desmarais family is originally from Quebec and descended from Paul Desmarais who moved to Canada from Saint-Sauveur-sur-École, Île-de-France in late 1600s.

Desmarais' grandfather Noël Desmarais 1873–1964 (wife: Roseanna 1874–1964) founded the town of Noëlville, Ontario, now part of the municipality of French River.

Two of his brothers, Louis Desmarais and Jean Noël Desmarais, were involved in federal politics.

Desmarais was married to Jacqueline Maranger, also from Sudbury. They had two sons: Paul Jr. and André (who is married to former Canadian prime minister Jean Chrétien's daughter France) and two daughters, Louise and Sophie.

The Desmarais family has a large family estate in Sagard, Quebec, Canada, between the villages of Saint-Siméon and Petit-Saguenay: Domaine Laforest. The area of the estate is over 75 square kilometres. The Desmarais family also owned secondary homes in Palm Beach, Florida and New York at the time of his death.

== Philanthropy ==
Desmarais was a philanthropist, making substantial contributions (many anonymously) to the arts, education, health and the homeless.

At the time of M. Desmarais' death, Prime Minister Stephen Harper said in a statement that Desmarais was “one of Canada’s most successful businessmen” and will be remembered for his leadership, his philanthropy and community involvement as well as his “profound attachment to his country.” Many institutions, which benefited from Desmarais' contributions also paid tribute to the business man. These include McGill University “He was someone who felt an obligation to contribute to our broader society in many different ways and we were all the richer for that.”

Today, many pavilions are named in his honour, including the Jean-Noël Desmarais Pavilion at The Montreal Museum of Fine Arts and the Paul-G.-Desmarais Pavilion at the Université de Montréal.

== Career ==
After graduating from the University of Ottawa, Desmarais went to Osgoode Law School until he began working for Sudbury Bus Lines Limited, the restructured bus company formed from the remnants of the Sudbury and Copper Cliff Suburban Electric Railway his grandfather had founded. The company was sold to him for a symbolic 1 CAD, because it was almost insolvent. He rescued the company and acquired additional bus lines in the Ottawa area and Quebec City (including Quebec Autobus, Provincial Transport and Regional Transport). By 1968 the holding company which Desmarais had acquired three years earlier, Trans-Canada Corporation Fund (TCCF), owned the bus line Provincial Transport, an interest in Toronto-based Imperial Life Assurance and Gesca Ltée, (which had an interest in the Montreal paper La Presse). That year TCCF made a share-exchange offer with Power Corporation of Canada, headquartered in Montreal, Quebec, whereby Paul Desmarais became chairman and chief executive officer and controlling shareholder.

He founded the Canada China Business Council in 1978.

== Power Corporation of Canada ==
Taking advantage of the substantial investment of Power Corporation of Canada, Desmarais took control of a large pulp and paper company, Consolidated Bathurst (built since in Stone-Consolidated, then merged with Abitibi-Price Inc. to form Abitibi-Consolidated, then Abitibi-Bowater and Resolute). At the same time, under the leadership of Desmarais, Power Corporation of Canada continued to acquire control positions in Great-West Life and Investors Group which formed the basis of Power Financial Corporation which was founded in 1984. Acquiring Trans-Canada Corporation Fund, Desmarais obtained the newspaper La Presse in 1968, which enabled him to gain experience in the field of print media in Canada. Then he looked for companies in Europe and he met the Belgian financier Albert Frère to the board of directors of Paribas. The two men discovered an alter ego, applying the same financial techniques: a friendly investment in substantial firms, some of which were experiencing financial hardship. Desmarais owned about 15% of Groupe Bruxelles Lambert, a Belgian holding company, which in 2001 acquired a 25% interest in the German media company Bertelsmann, whose subsidiaries include BMG and Random House (the German company Bertelsmann bought the 25% back in July 2006). Groupe Bruxelles Lambert currently holds positions in global industrial and services companies based in Europe including: Imerys, LafargeHolcim, adidas, SGS, Pernod Ricard, Umicore, Ontex, GEA and Parques.

== Politics ==
The Desmarais family enjoys connections to politicians worldwide. Critics charge that the family's political connections provide it with unfair advantages in business.

According to a profile in The Australian, "Desmarais grew to command the intersection of Canadian business and politics through close relations with four prime ministers." Desmarais was an advisor to Prime Minister Pierre Elliott Trudeau. Brian Mulroney worked as a labour lawyer for Desmarais before entering politics, and Desmarais named his then-employee Paul Martin as president of Canada Steamship Lines Inc. (Power Corp.'s Great Lakes shipping subsidiary) in 1974 (Desmarais sold the company to Martin in 1981.) Prime Minister Jean Chrétien was related to Desmarais by marriage; Chretien's daughter France is married to Desmarais' son André. Both Mulroney and Trudeau were on advisory boards for Power Corp. after leaving office.

According to Le Figaro, Paul Desmarais Sr. was a close associate of former French president Nicolas Sarkozy. Paul Desmarais Sr. and Sarkozy were together at the party at Fouquet's to celebrate the election of the new president on May 6, 2007. In 2004, Nicolas Sarkozy was a guest at his estate in Sagard, in Charlevoix, a good distance from the Saint Lawrence. «Quand tu entres dans la propriété, on t'ouvre un premier portail. Ensuite, tu dois faire des kilomètres et des kilomètres avant d'arriver au château...» ("When you enter the property, they open the first gate. Then you have to go kilometers and kilometers before arriving at the chateau...") Nicolas Sarkozy told about the fortitude of his friend Desmarais. Sophie Desmarais' ex-husband, Eric Le Moyne de Sérigny, is also close to Nicolas Sarkozy, heads numerous companies, and was a member of the board of directors of Imerys.

Desmarais was an opponent of the Quebec sovereignty movement. On February 2, 2009, French President Nicolas Sarkozy made comments asking Quebec sovereigntists to focus on unity and not separation from Canada, and to put their goals of sovereignty on hold during tough economic times. This angered many sovereigntists who claimed that Sarkozy was acting under the influence of Desmarais.

== Death ==
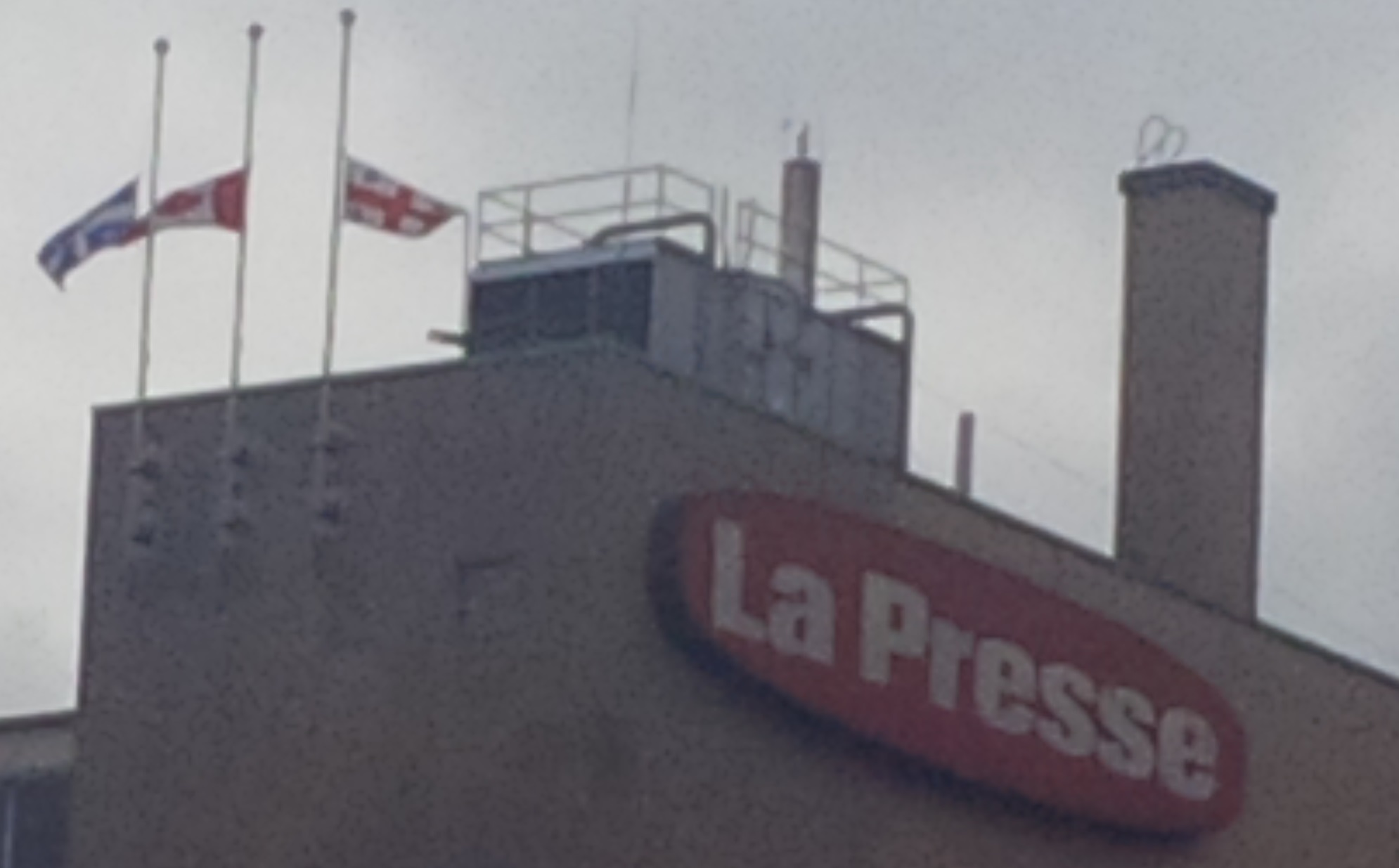
The Canadian, Québec and Montréal flags half-masted in honour of Desmarais at the La Presse building in Montréal.

Desmarais' funeral was a private event. A public memorial was held on December 3, 2013 at Notre-Dame Basilica in Montreal. Many politicians, dignitaries and members of the business and cultural communities were present, including: Laurent Beaudoin, Robert Charlebois, Jean Chrétien, Bill Davis, Denis Coderre, Stephen Harper, Pauline Marois, Brian Mulroney, Bob Rae and Nicolas Sarkozy. Many testimonials were shared around the time of his death and the ceremony:

- Bernard Landry had said after his death that they “were totally opposed on many matters — the national fate of Quebec of course, the management of modern capitalism. But for many other things, internationalism, culture, we were on the same floor. And that’s why we remained friends.”

== Awards ==
- 1978 – Officer of the Order of Canada
- 1987 – Companion of the Order of Canada
- 1988 – Officer of the National Order of Quebec
- 1991 – Commandeur de l’Ordre de Léopold II (Belgium)
- 1992 – Member of the Queen's Privy Council for Canada
- 2008 – Grand Cross of the National Order of the Legion of Honour (France)

== Honorary degrees ==
- LL.D., University of Moncton, Moncton, New Brunswick
- LL.D., Wilfrid Laurier University, Waterloo, Ontario
- D.Adm., University of Ottawa, Ottawa, Ontario
- LL.D., St. Francis Xavier University, Antigonish, Nova-Scotia
- LL.D., Laurentian University, Greater Sudbury, Ontario
- LL.D., McMaster University, Hamilton, Ontario
- Doctorate Honoris Causa, University of Montréal, Montréal, Québec
- LL.D., Memorial University Of Newfoundland, St. John's, Newfoundland
- LL.D., Concordia University, Montréal, Québec
- LL.D., McGill University, Montréal, Québec
- D.Adm., Laval University, Québec, Québec
- LL.D., University of Toronto, Toronto, Ontario
- LL.D., University of Manitoba, Winnipeg, Manitoba

== Medals ==
=== Honours ===
Ribbon bars of Paul Desmarais

Academic offices
Preceded by G. Alain Frecker	Chancellor of Memorial University of Newfoundland; 1979–1988	Succeeded by John Crosbie
