= Mount Royal Cemetery =

Cemetery in Montreal, Quebec, Canada

- Cimetière Mont-Royal
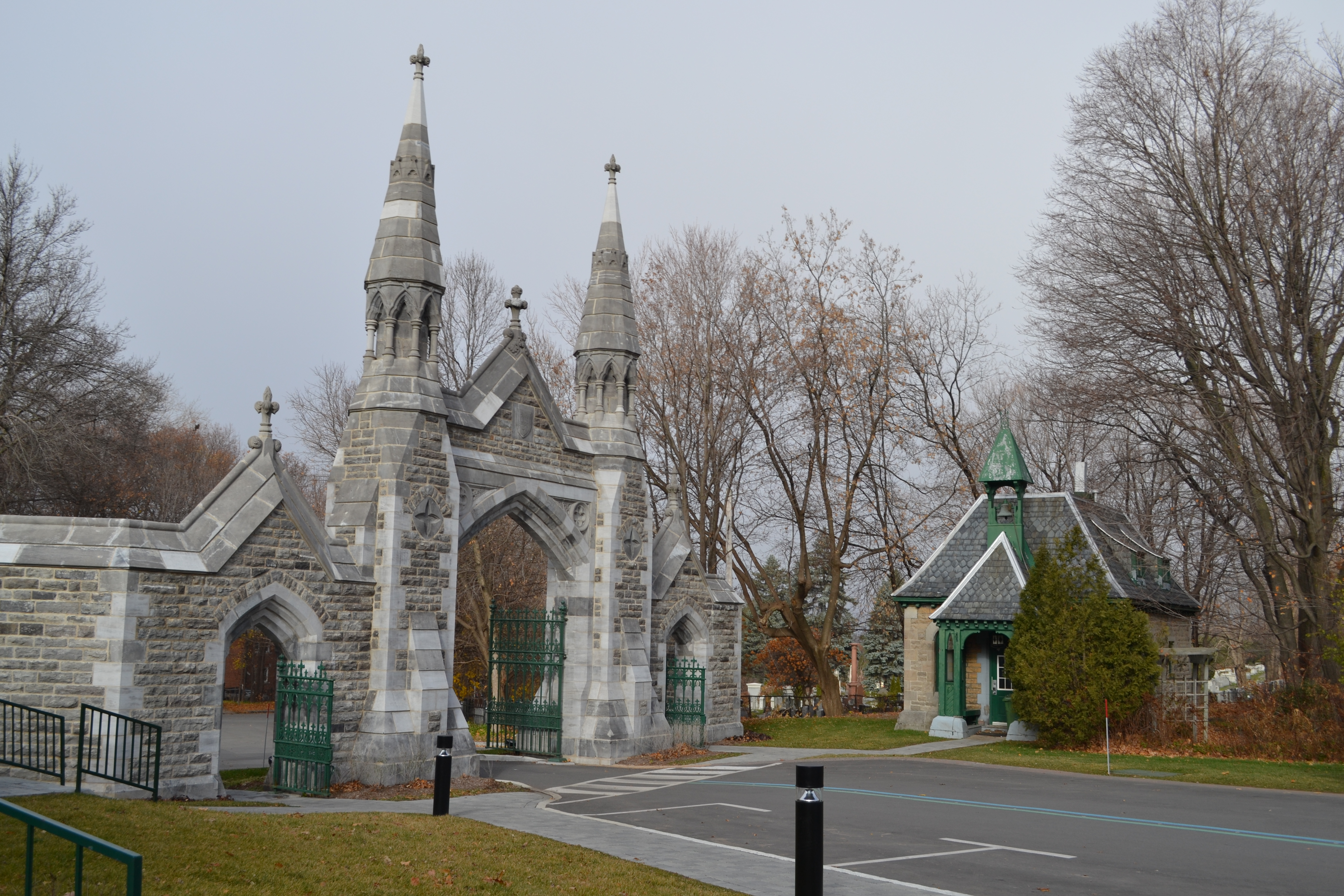
- The cemetery's gate in November 2016
- Interactive map of Mount Royal Cemetery

Details
- Established: 1852
- Location: Outremont, Montreal, Quebec
- Country: Canada
- Coordinates: 45.508°N 73.599°W
- Type: Non-denominational (originally Protestant)
- Owned by: The Mount Royal Cemetery Company
- Size: 165 acres (67 ha)
- No. of graves: 200,000
- Website: Official website

National Historic Site of Canada
- Designated: 1998

Mount Royal Cemetery (French: Cimetière Mont-Royal) is a 165-acre (67 ha) terraced cemetery on the north slope of Mount Royal in the borough of Outremont in Montreal, Quebec, Canada. It opened in 1852. Temple Emanu-El Cemetery, a Reform Judaism burial ground, is within the Mount Royal grounds. The burial ground shares the mountain with the much larger adjacent Roman Catholic cemetery, Notre Dame des Neiges Cemetery, and the Shaar Hashomayim Cemetery, an Ashkenazi Jewish cemetery. Mount Royal Cemetery is bordered on the southeast by Mount Royal Park, on the west by Notre-Dame-des-Neiges Cemetery, and on the north by Shaar Hashomayim Cemetery. In the springtime, the Lilac Knoll section is flush with hydrangeas, and autumn leaf walking tours are frequent.

Although the cemetery is non-denominational today, it continues to be governed by its original charter, with a board of trustees representing the founding Protestant denominations. The cemetery is a private non-profit organization. While most sections of the cemetery are mixed, there are ‘neighbourhoods’ suitable for different communities and their burial needs, with rich histories.

Burial rights have always been offered in perpetuity, with the commitment that no graves would ever be reused or abandoned. The founding charter stipulates that all profits should be entirely devoted to the embellishment and improvement of the property. Mount Royal Cemetery is still in operation, and even the older portions of the cemetery have some burial sites available, although casket-sized graves are increasingly in short supply.

== Design ==
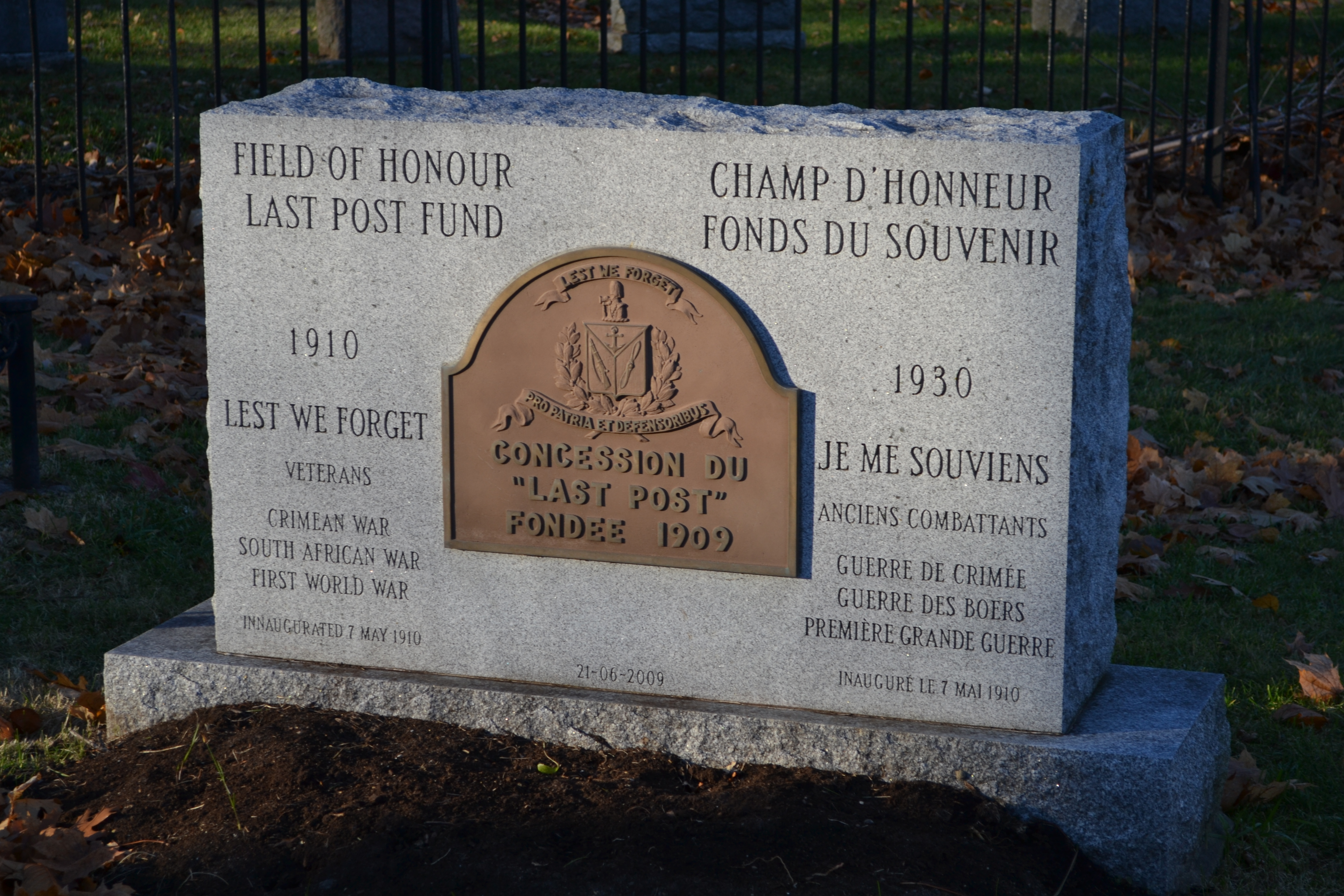
A memorial laid in honour of veterans at the War Graves section of the cemetery

=== Crematory ===
The first crematory in Canada was built by Sir Andrew Taylor in 1901 on the eastern side of the Mount Royal Cemetery property with funds donated by Sir William Christopher Macdonald, a well-known tobacco tycoon and great philanthropist. This building is the oldest of its kind in the country and it remained the only crematorium in Quebec until 1975. The first cremation took place on April 18, 1902.

Built with Montreal limestone, the original building had a chapel, a room for the cremation chambers, a large winter storage vault and a conservatory filled with exotic plants. In the 1950s, for maintenance reasons, the conservatory was demolished but the original chapel, on the left of the building, is still intact with a handmade mosaic floor and casket-door that lowers to the crematorium and prep rooms beneath. The gatehouse to the left of the Chemin de la Forêt entrance, as well as the cemetery office, are some of the original structures — waiting attendants used to wait in the gatehouse for their carriages during the winter.

=== War Graves section ===
The cemetery contains 459 war graves of Commonwealth service personnel, 276 from World War I and 183 from World War II, most of which form two War Plots in Section G. A Cross of Sacrifice stands on the boundary with Notre-Dame-des-Neiges Cemetery.

Military graves at Mount Royal did not take significance until World War I, when Canada lost over 60 000 soldiers. After this event, the population of the city started taking public memory more seriously, and gave an entire section of the cemetery to war veterans and fallen soldiers.

== Notable interments ==
Prominent people interred in the cemetery include the following:

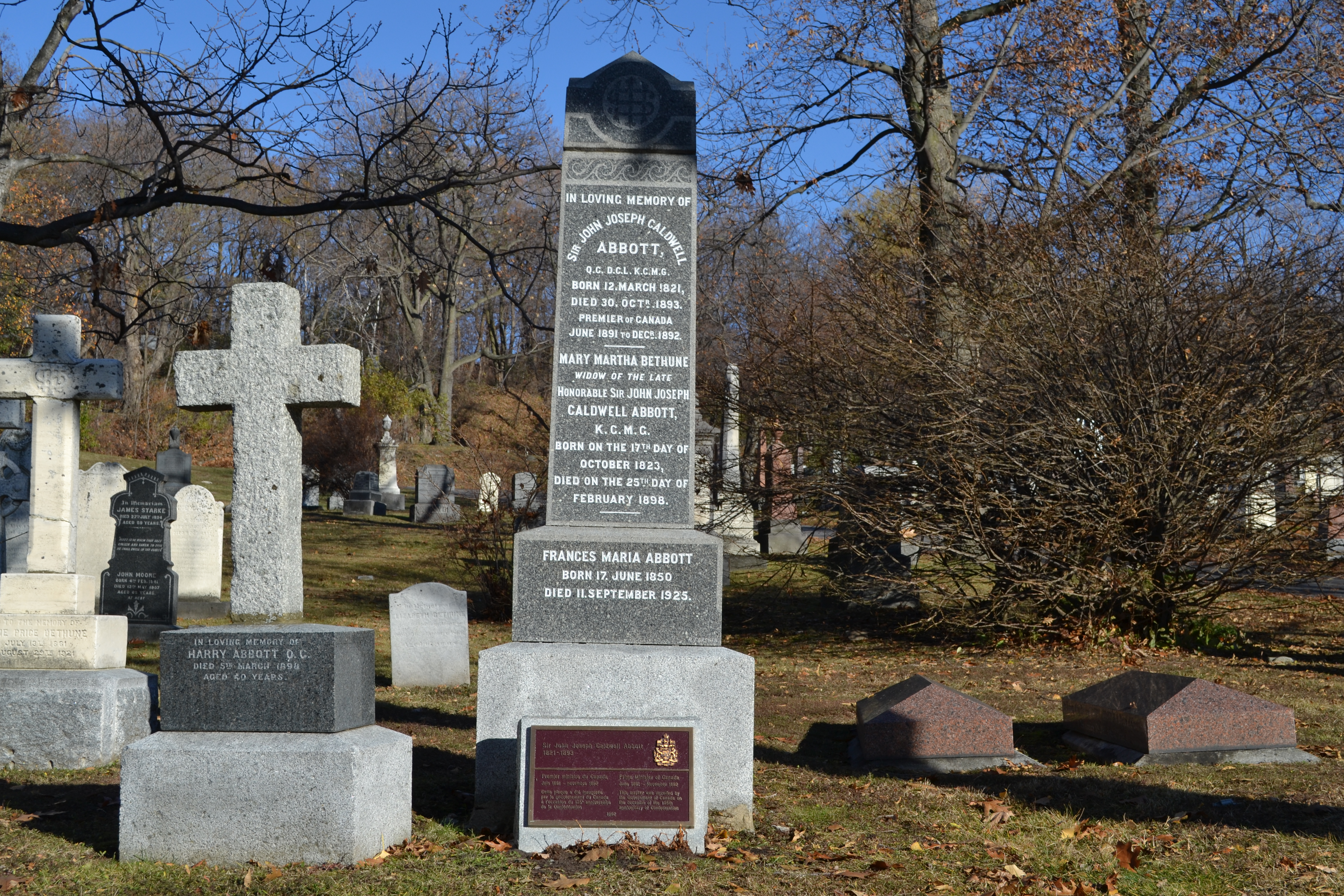
Gravestone for John Abbott, the third Prime Minister of Canada

- Sir John Abbott (1821–1893), prime minister of Canada
- Sir Hugh Allan (1810–1882), financier and shipping magnate
- Sir Montagu Allan (1860–1951), businessman, Hockey Hall of Fame member
- Richard Bladworth Angus (1831–1922), banker
- Henry Birks (1840–1928), businessman
- William Thomas Benson (1824–1885), businessman, politician
- Frank Calder (1877–1943), National Hockey League executive
- William Cecil Christmas (1879–1941), businessman, Canada's Sports Hall of Fame
- Charles Chiniquy (1809–1899), Presbyterian minister and socio-political activist
- William Clark-Kennedy (1879–1961), Scots-born Victoria Cross recipient
- Sir Arthur Currie (1875–1933), First World War military commander, educator
- Sir Mortimer Barnett Davis (1866–1928), businessman and philanthropist
- Norman Dawe (1898–1948), Canadian sports executive
- J. William Dawson (1820–1899), scientist, educator
- George Mercer Dawson (1849–1901), scientist
- William Dow (1800–1868), brewer and businessman
- Sir George Alexander Drummond (1829–1910), entrepreneur
- William Henry Drummond (1854–1907), Irish-Canadian poet, doctor
- Edith Maude Eaton (1865–1914), author, a.k.a. "Sui Sin Far"
- Phil Edwards (1907–1971), athlete, physician
- Henry Ekers (1855–1937), Mayor of Montreal 1906–1908.
- Charles Edward Frosst (1867–1948), pharmaceuticals manufacturer
- Henry Fry (1826–1896), ship-broker, ship owner and commission merchant based in Quebec City

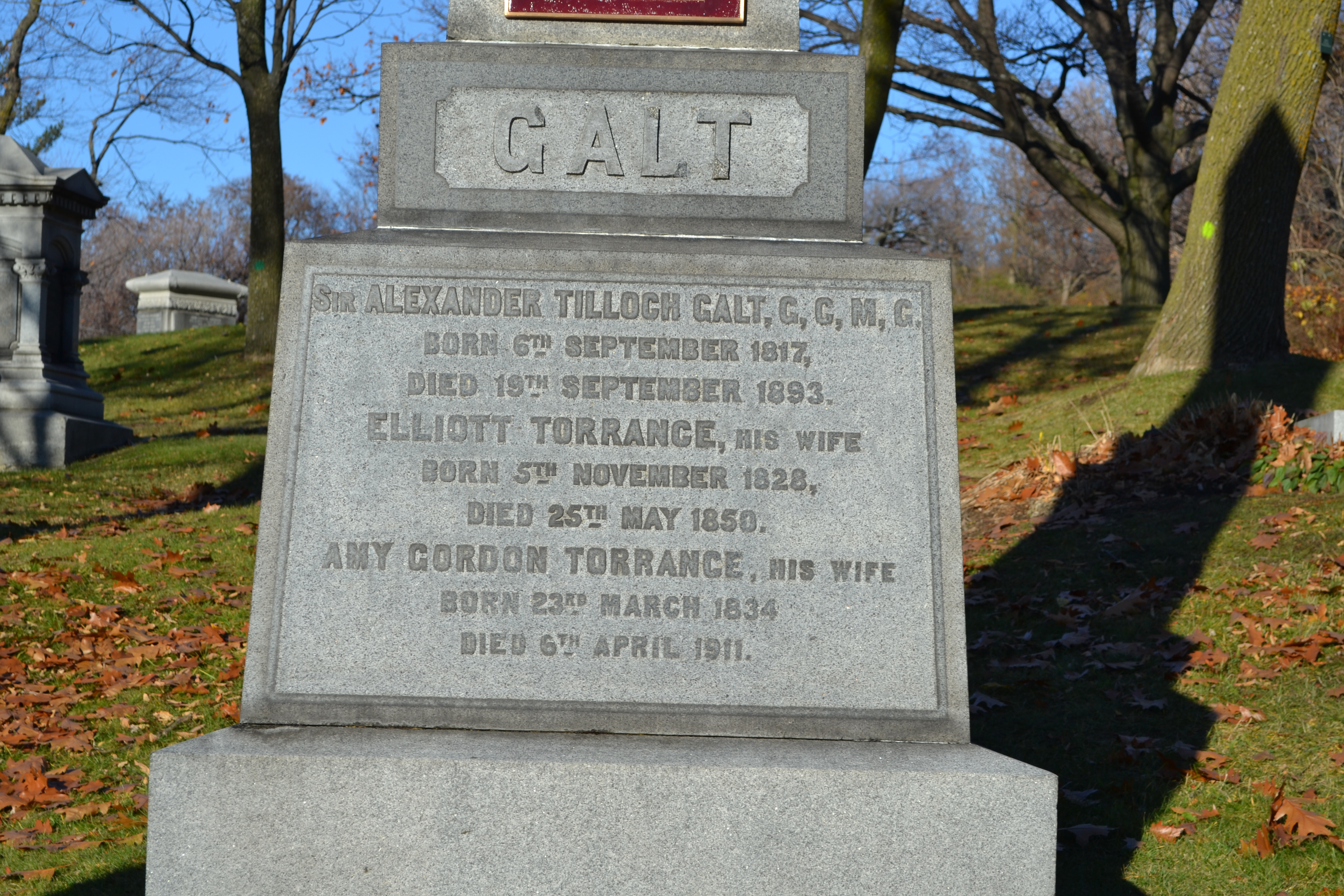
Gravestone of Alexander Tilloch Galt, a Canadian politician, and one of the Fathers of Confederation

- Sir Alexander Galt (1817–1893), businessman, statesman, Father of Confederation
- Horatio Gates (1777–1834), businessman, statesman
- Samuel Gerrard (1767–1857), businessman
- Sir Charles Blair Gordon (1867–1939), industrialist, president of Dominion Textile and the Bank of Montreal
- Hugh Graham, 1st Baron Atholstan (1848–1938), newspaper publisher
- Frank Greenleaf (1877–1953), Canadian sports administrator
- Joseph Guibord, (1809–1869), printer, temporarily interred here six years pending litigation about his disputed burial in Notre Dame des Neiges Cemetery in 1875
- Charles Melville Hays (1856–1912), Grand Trunk Railway executive and Titanic victim
- Charles Heavysege (1816–1876), author, poet
- Sir Herbert Holt (1856–1941), financier
- C. D. Howe (1886–1960), American-born politician and engineer
- Margaret Kempe Howell (1806–1867), mother of Varina Davis and mother-in-law of Jefferson Davis

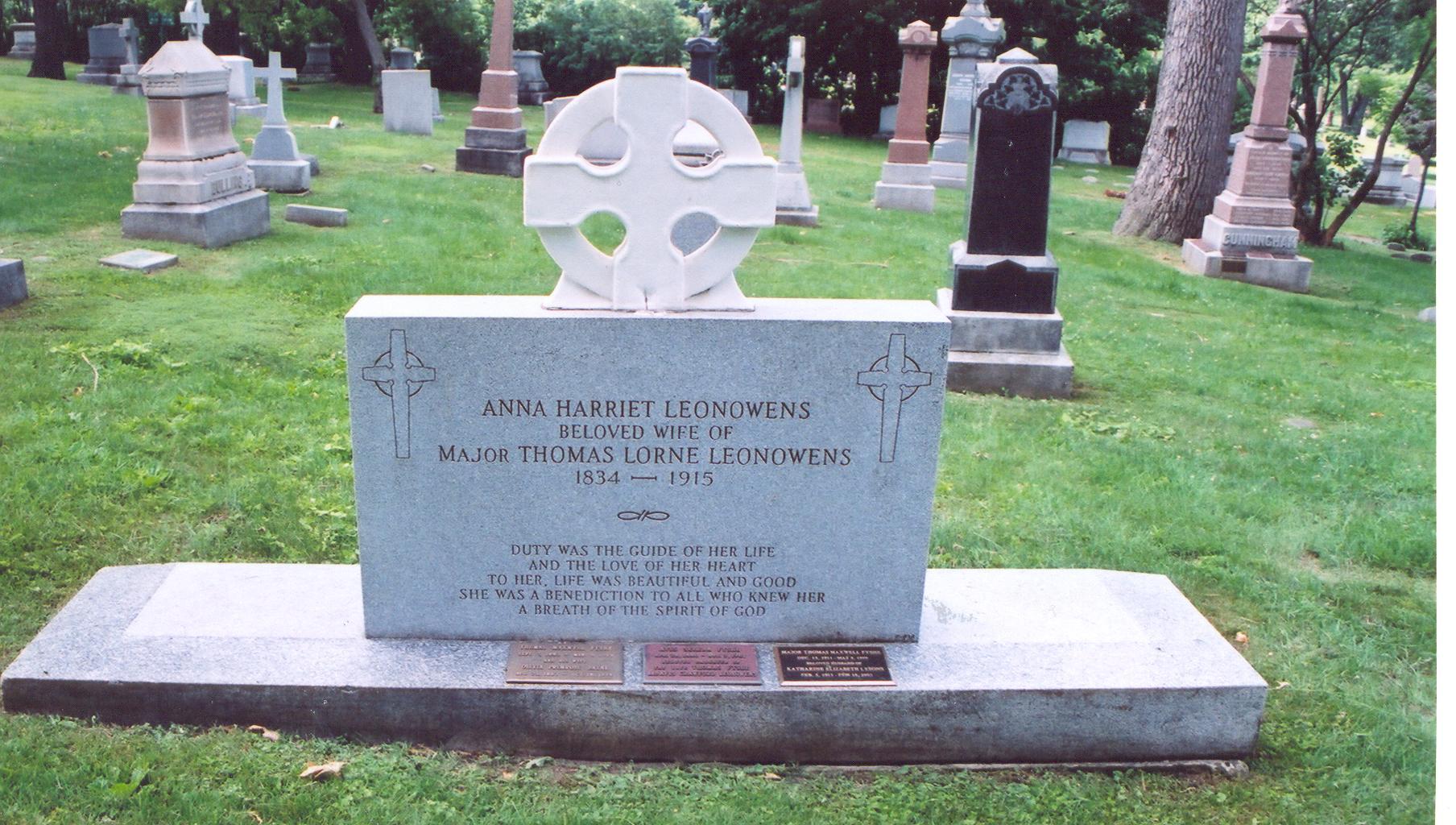
Gravestone for Anna Leonowens, founder of the Nova Scotia College of Art and Design

- Anna Leonowens (1834–1915), governess (Anna of Anna and the King of Siam), founder of Nova Scotia College of Art and Design
- Hannah Lyman (1816–1871), educator, biographer
- Robert Mackay (1840–1916), businessman, statesman
- Sir William C. Macdonald (1831–1917), tobacco manufacturer, philanthropist
- John Wilson McConnell (1877–1963), publisher, philanthropist
- David Ross McCord (1844–1930), lawyer, philanthropic founder of the McCord Museum of Canadian History
- Air Vice Marshall F.S. McGill (1894–1980), professional athlete, businessman, RCAF officer
- John Jones McGill (1860–1942), industrialist, philanthropist
- Peter McGill (1789–1860), businessman, municipal politician
- Duncan McIntyre (1834–1894), businessman
- Earle McLaughlin, (1915–1991) president & chairman, Royal Bank of Canada
- Charles Meredith (1854–1928), president of the Montreal Stock Exchange
- Frederick Edmund Meredith (1862–1941), chancellor of Bishop's University
- Sir Vincent Meredith (1850–1929), 1st Baronet of Montreal, president of the Bank of Montreal
- William Campbell James Meredith (1904–1960), Dean of Law, McGill University
- Shadrach Minkins (c. 1815–1875), American-born fugitive slave rescued from federal custody in Boston in 1851
- Hartland Molson (1907–2002), brewing magnate, World War II fighter pilot, statesman
- John Molson (1763–1836), brewing tycoon
- Colonel W. J. B. MacLeod Moore (born Kildare (Ireland), January 14, 1810, died Prescott (Ontario), September 10, 1890), founder of Masonic Knights Templar in Canada and Societas Roscruciana in Anglia (Canada)
- Howie Morenz (1902–1937), Hall of Fame ice hockey player
- Henry Morgan (1819–1893), opened first department store in Canada
- Frederick Cleveland Morgan (1881–1962), businessman, heir, philanthropist, and art collector
- Arthur Deane Nesbitt (1910–1978), decorated soldier of World War II, stockbroker
- Arthur J. Nesbitt (1880–1954), cofounder of Nesbitt Thomson & Co. and Power Corporation of Canada
- J. Aird Nesbitt (1907–1985), owner/operator of Ogilvy's department store in Montreal
- Arno Niitov (1904–1989), Estonian singing teacher, and opera and concert baritone
- William Notman (1826–1891), photographer and businessman

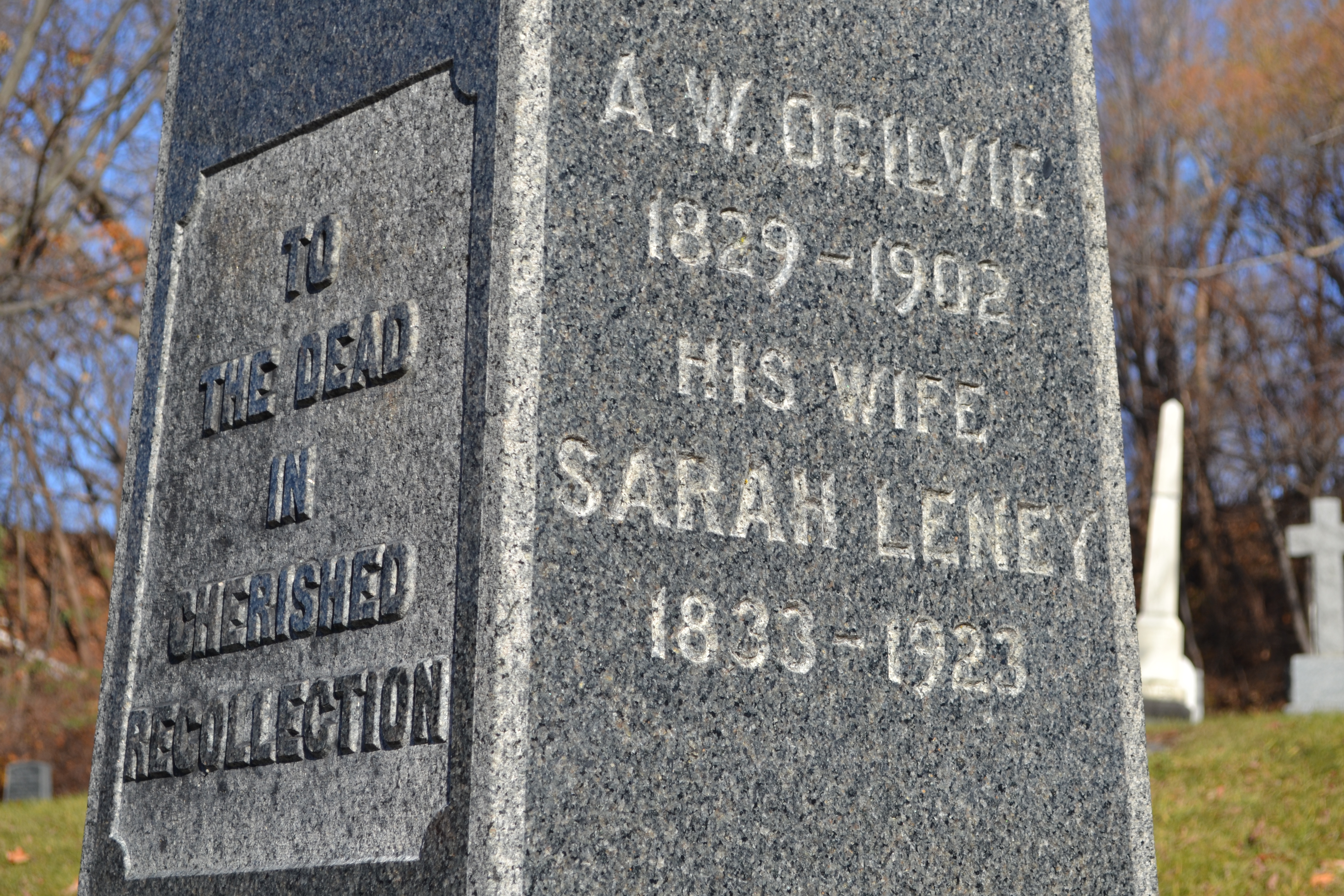
Gravestone for Alexander Walker Ogilvie, along with his wife

- Alexander Walker Ogilvie (1829–1902), miller, statesman
- William Watson Ogilvie (1835–1900) miller
- Frank L. Packard (1877–1942), mystery writer
- Thomas Kennedy Ramsay (1826–1886), jurist and judge
- John Redpath (1796–1869), contractor, built the first sugar refinery in Canada
- Elsie Reford (1872–1967), philanthropist and creator of the Jardins de Métis (Reford Gardens) in Grand-Métis
- Robert Wilson Reford (1867–1951), shipping executive, artist, photographer
- Mordecai Richler (1931–2001), author
- Anne Savage (1896–1971), painter and art teacher
- F. R. Scott (1899–1985), scholar
- Francis Scrimger (1880–1937), physician, Victoria Cross recipient
- Sir George Simpson (c1786–1860), Hudson's Bay Company administrator, explorer, author
- Denis Stairs (1889–1980), chairman, Montreal Engineering Co.
- George Washington Stephens (1832–1904), businessman, lawyer, politician, philanthropist
- David Thompson (1770–1857), mapmaker, astronomer and explorer
- David Torrance (1805–1876), merchant, banker
- John Torrance (1786–1870), merchant, shipper
- Jocelyn Gordon Whitehead (1895–1954), delivered the fatal sucker punch to magician Harry Houdini
- Ernest Henry Wilson (1876–1930), notable British plant collector and explorer
- Thomas Workman (1813–1889), businessman, politician, philanthropist
- William Workman (1807–1878), businessman and municipal politician
- John Francis Young (1893–1929), Victoria Cross recipient
- Walter P. Zeller (1890–1957), founder of Zellers

== See also ==
- Mount Royal Park
