= Arthur Nesbitt =

Arthur Nesbitt may refer to:

- Arthur Deane Nesbitt (1910–1978), Canadian businessman and pilot
- Arthur Russell Nesbitt (1883–1962), Ontario lawyer and political figure
- Arthur James Nesbitt (1880–1954), Canadian businessman and philanthropist
