= Royal Securities Corporation =

- Company type: Public company (now defunct)
- Industry: Stock brokerage
- Founded: 1903
- Headquarters: Halifax, Nova Scotia, Canada
- Key people: John F. Stairs (founder); Max Aitken; Izaak Walton Killam

Royal Securities Corporation Limited was a stock brokerage firm founded in Halifax, Nova Scotia, Canada in early 1903 by John F. Stairs, its first president. The company was the first brokerage firm to be opened east of Montreal, Quebec, the then financial center of Canada.

A prominent and influential businessman, John F. Stairs was also a former politician who had been elected to the Nova Scotia House of Assembly and the House of Commons of Canada. He was involved with many companies owned by his family and others, including the Union Bank of Halifax. He had hired inexperienced 23-year-old New Brunswick native Max Aitken who immediately demonstrated an ingenious understanding of the world of commerce. Stairs made Aitken his personal assistant and on its formation, appointed him as Royal Securities' secretary and general manager. In its formative years, Royal Securities put together financing packages for Nova Scotia industries and raised the capital for several British West Indies public utility companies including ones where Stairs and his family were significant investors.

In 1904, Royal Securities hired Izaak Walton Killam, an employee working for the Stairs' family's Union Bank of Halifax. John F. Stairs died unexpectedly at the end of September 1904 while on a business trip to Toronto. His brother, George Stairs (1856-1908) took over as president but poor health saw Max Aitken, already a minority shareholder, acquire control of Royal Securities. Aitken soon hired and trained Arthur Nesbitt, a dry goods salesman from Saint John, New Brunswick. Because Montreal was the financial center of Canada, in 1906 Aitken would send Arthur Nesbitt to open the Montreal branch of Royal Securities. For years, the company was closely affiliated through a controlling equity position in Montreal Engineering Company, Ltd., an international engineering firm founded by Max Aitken and associates in 1907 and today part of the British conglomerate, AMEC. Eventually, Denis Stairs, the son of George Stairs, would serve as a director of Royal Securities and chairman of Montreal Engineering.

Arthur Nesbitt helped build Royal Securities into an important member of the burgeoning investment banking community. Among his accomplishments, he was responsible for a 1910 bond issue by the Price Brothers Co. that at the time represented the largest public financing of a Canadian newsprint company. However, in 1912 Arthur Nesbitt left Max Aitken's employ to form the Nesbitt, Thomson and Company stockbrokerage partnership. Aitken then appointed Izaak Walton Killam, then an employee at his London office, as the new President of Royal Securities and, firmly ensconced in England, in 1919 sold the Canadian company to Killam. In November 1920, Royal Securities acquired the seven storey office building at 244 Saint James Street from the London & Lancashire Life Assurance Company who had built it 1898 as their Canadian head office. Royal Securities owned the building until May 1965.

Under Izaak Walton Killiam's guidance, Royal Securities continued to prosper, becoming one of the largest and most respected brokerage houses in Canada with a significant presence in every province. The company was a leader in the underwriting and distribution of share issues for the rapidly growing domestic pulp and paper business that grew hand-in-hand with the development of the electric power industry. Royal Securities was also a major underwriter and agent for numerous government bond issues. Operating from its headquarters on Montreal's famous St. James Street, Royal Securities became a publicly traded company, listed on the Montreal, Canadian and Toronto Stock Exchanges. In the early 1950s, Killam retired from active business due to failing health and before his death in 1955 made generous arrangements to allow the sale of Royal Securities to his close business associates. In 1969, the company was sold to Merrill Lynch and would become Merrill Lynch, Royal Securities Limited. Eventually, the Royal Securities name vanished and the company operated as Merrill Lynch Canada Ltd. who over time would sell off their Canadian retail brokerage business to Canadian Imperial Bank of Commerce.
