= Arthur Deane Nesbitt =

Canadian businessman (1910–1978)

- Born: 16 November 1910; Westmount, Quebec
- Died: 22 February 1978 (aged 67); Montreal, Quebec
- Education: McGill University (BSc 1933)
- Spouse: Ruth Sharrill McMaster (m. 1939)
- Father: Arthur James Nesbitt
- Relatives: J. Aird Nesbitt (brother)
- Military career
- Branch: Royal Canadian Air Force
- Service years: 1939–1945
- Rank: Group Captain
- Unit: No. 401 Squadron RCAF
- Conflicts: World War II: Battle of Britain

Group Captain Arthur Deane Nesbitt OBE DFC (16 November 1910 – 22 February 1978) was a Canadian air force officer and businessman.

== Early life ==
Nesbitt was born in Westmount, Quebec, the son of the very successful stockbroker and co-founder of Nesbitt, Thomson and Company, Arthur James Nesbitt. Trained as an electrical engineer, after his older brother Aird decided to take over permanent management of the family-owned Ogilvy department store in Montreal, Nesbitt joined the family's securities business. On the death of his father in 1954, he became head of the brokerage firm and took over the presidency of the Nesbitt Thomson holding company, Power Corporation of Canada. Under his guidance, Nesbitt Thomson expanded across Canada, and into the United States and Europe. They were the first Canadian firm in three decades to obtain a seat on the New York Stock Exchange.

A flying enthusiast, Nesbitt obtained his pilot's license and as a member of the Montreal Light Aeroplane Club, and was twice voted the James Lytell Memorial Trophy as the club's top pilot.

== Wartime service ==
He had 200 flying hours to his credit when he enlisted in the Royal Canadian Air Force on 15 September 1939. Nesbitt was trained at Camp Borden as a fighter pilot. As a Flying Officer, Nesbitt was then posted to No 1 Squadron RCAF, and flew Hurricanes with the unit during the Battle of Britain. On 26 August 1940 Nesbitt claimed a 'Do215' destroyed, and Messerschmitt Bf 109s on 4 and 15 September. He was wounded on 15 September.

Following his recovery, he later commanded No. 401 Squadron. He returned to Canada in September 1941 to command No. 14 Squadron and later No. 111 Squadron. He was promoted to wing commander in June 1942 and given command of Station Annette Island. Nesbitt was made CO, No. 6 SFTS, Dunneville, in December 1943, and in March 1944 returned to the UK to command No. 144 Wing. he then joined No. 83 Group HQ as Accidents Investigation Officer. Promoted to group captain on 1 January 1945, Nesbitt then commanded No. 143 Wing, with Hawker Typhoons from January to August 1945, before returning to Canada in September 1945, retiring in November 1947.

Along with his brother Aird, who served in the Canadian Army, he took part in the liberation of the Netherlands and at Eindhoven.

For his service, Nesbitt received a number of military honours, including the Distinguished Flying Cross. In 1946 he was made an Officer of the Order of the British Empire and in 1947 a Commander of the Order of Orange-Nassau with Swords, and awarded the Croix de Guerre with Silver Star by the government of France.

== Postwar career ==
After being decommissioned at the end of the War, Nesbitt rejoined the family's St. James Street securities firm. Highly successful in business, he also organised the financing for the TransCanada pipeline in the 1950s, the then-largest natural gas pipeline in the world and one of the most significant energy projects in the history of Canada. His long and successful business career earned him an induction into the Canadian Business Hall of Fame.

At the age of 67, Nesbitt suffered a skiing accident that left him near totally paralyzed on 4 February. He died in Montreal in 1978 and was interred in the Mount Royal Cemetery.

In his honor, the BMO Nesbitt Burns division of the Bank of Montreal established the A. Deane Nesbitt/Charles Burns Award recognizing exceptional performance.

== See also ==
- List of Bishop's College School alumni

== Sources ==
- Air Force Association of Canada decorations for A. Deane Nesbitt
- Government of Canada, "The Nesbitts" - Nation Builders collection
