= Denis Stairs (engineer) =

Canadian engineer and businessman

Denis Stairs OBE, B.Eng. (May 3, 1889 – January 14, 1980) was a Canadian engineer and businessman. He was born in Halifax, Nova Scotia, the son of George Stairs, a founding partner and president of Royal Securities Corporation. A graduate of Dalhousie University, Denis Stairs studied at MIT then as a director of Royal Securities he became associated with entrepreneur and press baron Sir Max Aitken (later Lord Beaverbrook) and Izaak W. Killam. In 1922, he relocated to Montreal, Quebec, where he worked as an assistant engineer for Killam's Montreal Engineering Company, Ltd., rising to vice-president and eventually chairman of the board of directors.

During World War I, Stairs served overseas with the Canadian Expeditionary Force and was made an officer of the Order of the British Empire for his volunteer work as the Federal Director-General of the Defence Projects, Construction Branch during World War II.

Denis Stairs died in 1980 at the age of ninety and is buried in the Mount Royal Cemetery in Montreal.
