= Henry Fry (merchant) =

English-Canadian shipping merchant

- Born: June 5, 1826; St Stephen's Parish, Bristol, Gloucestershire, England
- Died: February 27, 1896 (aged 69); Sweetsburg, Quebec, Canada (part of Cowansville)
- Resting place: Mount Royal Cemetery, Montreal, Quebec, Canada
- Occupation: Commission merchant, Ship-broker and owner
- Spouse: Mary Jane Dawson (m. 1858)
- Children: 7

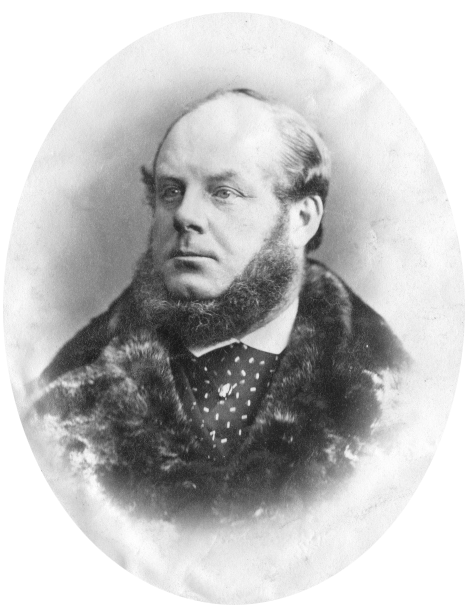

Henry Fry (1826–1896) was a ship-broker, ship owner and commission merchant based in Quebec City. He was Lloyd's of London agent for the St Lawrence River (Sorel to Gaspe); served as a director of the Quebec Bank (1864–1878), and member then president (1868–1871) of the Board of Trade, VP then President of the Dominion Board of Trade (1872 and 1873). He was respected for his knowledge of clipper ships and commerce, an advocate for limits on excessive deck-lading, which could cause ships to capsize, and against the practice of crimping. He wrote extensively about 19th century North Atlantic shipping, safety issues, navigation and trade.

== Early life ==
Fry was born on 5 June 1826 in St Stephen's Parish, Bristol, Gloucestershire, England, the eldest son of the second marriage of George Fry (1783–1868) of Bristol, England, and Charlotte Augusta Goss (1801–1876). He grew up close to the sea and, by his own account, had an innate "love of ships and everything connected with them." He left school, age 12 (1838), about the time that his father, a butcher/provisioner with local shipping interests, was in bankruptcy. He apprenticed in the Bristol shipping brokerage firm of Mark Whitwill and, by age 19, was conducting business for Whitwill's in Wales and London.

== Career ==
In 1851, he became a partner in Whitwell's. In 1853–54, Whitwill's sent him to oversee the salvaging of 2 ships in Quebec. Arriving via New York City after a troubled 40-day trans-Atlantic voyage aboard a barque named Cosmo, he travelled by land to Quebec City. The quality of his work was recognized by Lloyd's of London. In 1855, he acquired part interest in his first ship, Ant, eventually buying out his partners. By 1856, he had severed his connection with Whitwill's and established himself as a broker, ship owner, and commission merchant in Quebec City. In 1857, Fry was appointed Lloyd's agent for the St Lawrence River from Sorel to Gaspe. He arranged for salvage of ships; bought and sold many ships in his lifetime establishing a long and profitable relationship with the Quebec shipbuilding industry, notably with Henry Dinning and the firm of Henry Warner & Lauchlin McKay. He commissioned the building of ships at Quebec for the North Atlantic and world trade including the Mary Fry (launched May 1861, named after his wife), the Rock City (1868), and the renowned Cosmo (1877) "said to be the finest Quebec-built ship." Among the ship captains were his uncle, William Holmes Fry (1782–1866) and his brothers: Alfred Fry (c.1828–?), Charles Fry (1832–1905, master of the Mary Fry), Samuel Holmes Fry (1833–?), and Frederick Fry (c.1840–?). Another brother, Edward Carey Fry (1842–1918), became accountant and merchant in Henry Fry & Co, Quebec City.

== Marriage ==
On 9 December 1858, Montreal (Methodist St James), Henry married Mary Jane Dawson (1836–1932). His sister, Lucy Ann Fry (1837–1910) from Bristol attended the wedding. His bride was the daughter of Benjamin Dawson (1804–1892), bookseller of Montreal, and Elizabeth Gardener (1798–1867). They had one daughter Mary (Mame) Dawson Fry (1860–1896) and six sons: Henry Fry (1862–1925), William Marsh Fry (1864–1901), Arthur Dawson Fry (1866–1960), Alfred Gardner Fry (1868–1925), Frederick Morley Fry (1870–1936), and Ernest John Fry (1873–1936).

== Quebec ==
Fry served on many business and community boards in Quebec City related to trade, education, the Baptist Church, and public services, including as an assessor for the Quebec Vice-Admiralty Court, a director of the Quebec Bank 1864–78, a trustee of the Quebec High School 1866–77, treasurer of the Quebec Literary & Historical Society, president of the YMCA 1870–78 and committee member of the YWCA 1875–77, treasurer of the Baptist Church 1875–77 and of the Quebec City Mission 1870–77.

In his lifetime, he crossed the Atlantic 37 times, owned outright or had interests in more than 19 sailing ships. An over-achiever, he suffered from periodic mood swings and insomnia. In his retirement years, he wrote and published several works on steam ships, shipping and North Atlantic navigation as well as treatises illustrated with his meticulous drawings of ships, and memoirs, including Essays and Reminiscences.

== Death ==
He died in his 70th year on 27 February 1896 in Sweetsburg, Quebec, (part of Cowansville). Burial took place 2 March 1896 at Mount Royal Cemetery [M-1601], Montreal, Quebec. His wife, Mary, survived him by 36 years; she died in Montreal on 10 April 1932.

== Sources ==
- Avison-Fry Family Tree (Public in Ancestry.ca).
- Fry, Henry. "The Safest Ships Afloat: The safety and comfort of modern ocean travel as illustrated by the Canadian Pacific Railway Company’s Ocean Steamships," Canadian Magazine, [Vol 3, no. 2 (June 1894)]. Toronto: Ontario Pub. Co., 1894. pp 173–181.
- Fry, Henry. A Biographical Sketch of Sir N.F. Belleau. Quebec, 1894.
- Fry, Henry. Essays: written for, and affectionately dedicated to, my children [manuscript]. July 1889.
- Fry, Henry. Lloyd’s: its origin, history and methods [booklet] Quebec, 1895.
- Fry, Henry. Paper on "deck loads & grain cargoes" for the Dominion Board of Trade, 1872; [re-printed in] Nautical Magazine. 1873.
- Fry, Henry. The History of North Atlantic Steam Navigation: with some account of early ships and shipowner. London & New York, S. Low, Marston, 1896.
- Fry, Henry. Reminiscences. [manuscript] 1891.
- Fry, John. A Mind at Sea: Henry Fry and Quebec’s Great Shipbuilding Era [Biography]. Toronto, Dundurn Press, 2013. (to be published 2013)
- Marcil, Eileen. "Henry Fry." Dictionary of Canadian Biography, 1891-1900 (Volume XII). Toronto, University of Toronto Press, 1966
- Marcil, Eileen. The Charley-Man: a history of wooden shipbuilding at Quebec, 1763-1893. Kingston, Ont., Quarry Press, 1995. 439 p.
- Wallace, Frederick William. In the Wake of the Wind-Ships: Notes, Records and Biographies Pertaining to the Square-Rigged Merchant Marine of British North America. Toronto, Musson, 1927. 282 p.
