= J. Aird Nesbitt =

Canadian businessman (1908–1985)

- Born: 10 August 1908; Westmount, Quebec
- Died: 14 November 1985 (aged 77); Montreal, Quebec
- Education: McGill University
- Spouse: Honor Graham Mathewson (m. 1935)
- Father: Arthur James Nesbitt
- Relatives: Arthur Deane Nesbitt (brother)
- Military career
- Branch: Canadian Army
- Service years: 1939–1952
- Rank: Brigadier
- Units: The Black Watch; Cape Breton Highlanders; West Nova Scotia Regiment; 9th Canadian Infantry Brigade
- Conflicts: World War II

Brigadier James Aird Nesbitt ADC (10 August 1908 – 14 November 1985) was a Canadian department store owner.

== Early life and education ==
Born in Westmount, Quebec, he was the first of the two sons of the prominent stockbroker, Arthur J. Nesbitt.

== Career ==
Known as Aird, when his father purchased Ogilvy's Department Store on Saint Catherine Street in downtown Montreal in 1927, the twenty-year-old Aird Nesbitt took over management of the store. He proved to be a very capable merchandiser whose marketing skills made Ogilvy's one of Montreal's most popular stores. James Aird Nesbitt remained active in the running of the Ogilvy department store until his death in 1985. The executors of his estate sold the Ogilvy store that year.

In 1936, he co-founded the Westmount High Old Boys' Association.

Following the outbreak of World War II, in 1939 he joined the Canadian Army and served overseas. Nesbitt fought in the Italian Campaign and participated in the liberation of The Netherlands. The recipient of a number of service decorations, by the time he was decommissioned after the end of the war, Aird Nesbitt had earned the rank of Brigadier.

== Personal life ==
In 1935 Aird Nesbitt married Honor Graham Mathewson of Montreal.

An art collector, he owned Thomas Gainsborough's Portrait of Mrs James Unwin completed in 1771. In 1929, he published a biography of Canadian artist, John A. Hammond.

Nesbitt died at Royal Victoria Hospital in Montreal on 14 November 1985 at age 77. The funeral was held on 18 November St. George's Anglican Church. On his passing in 1985 he was interred with other family members in the Mount Royal Cemetery in Montreal.
