= Arno Niitov =

Estonian singing teacher and singer (1904–1989)

- Born: Arnold Korro; December 2, 1904; Tilsi, Governorate of Livonia, Russian Empire
- Died: October 17, 1989 (aged 84); Montreal, Canada
- Resting place: Mount Royal Cemetery, Montreal, Canada
- Occupations: Singing teacher and singer

Arno Niitov (also Arno Niitof, born Arnold Korro; December 2, 1904 – October 17, 1989) was an Estonian singing teacher, and an opera and concert baritone.

== Early life and education ==
Arno Niitov was born in Tilsi, Estonia, and named Arnold Korro. He was the son of Peter Korro (1863–1926) and Lisa Korro (née Kurrusk, 1869–?). He was adopted by Karl Niitov (1864–1954) in 1913.

He studied at Tartu Alexander High School and Tartu Commercial High School No. 1. Niitov had previously studied violin at the Tartu Music School, but his hand was caught in a wool machine when he was 14 years old, which led him to switch from playing violin to singing. Niitov studied singing at the Tartu College of Music from 1924 to 1927. He began performing quite early, as a student at the Faculty of Philosophy of the University of Tartu, performing as a soloist in student choirs.

In 1930, he graduated from the Royal Conservatory of Liège in Belgium, where he studied singing under maestro François Malherbe. Two years later he graduated from the Faculty of Economics at the University of Liège.

== Career ==
From 1932 to 1939, Niitov worked as a private singing teacher and music instructor, as well as the voice director of the Tartu Men's Singing Society choir and, at the invitation of Gustav Ernesaks, also of the Tallinn Men's Choir. Among the students in his voice studio were Andrei Christiansen, Jaan Haabjärv, Naan Põld, and Eino Uuli. He also sang at the Vanemuine Theater and taught singing at the Põlva Public Education Society, where he served as chairman of the board.

From 1935 to 1939, Arno Niitov taught at the Valga Music School, the Tallinn Pedagogical Institute, and the Tallinn Normal School. From 1940 to 1941, he was the head of the voice department at the Tallinn Conservatory.

In 1944 he moved to Germany and from there to Austria, and in 1952 to Canada. In Montreal he conducted the Estonian male choir, and he also worked as an apartment building office manager, a farmer, a restaurant owner, and a high school Latin teacher. In 1955, he was targeted by the Committee on Return to Homeland (a.k.a. the Mihakailov Committee), a "redefection" campaign that sought to persuade political exiles to relocate to the USSR.

Niitov died in Montreal in 1989, a few weeks short of his 85th birthday. He is buried in Mount Royal Cemetery in Monteal.
