= Tilsi =

Village in Estonia

Coordinates: 57°58′N 27°01′E

- Village
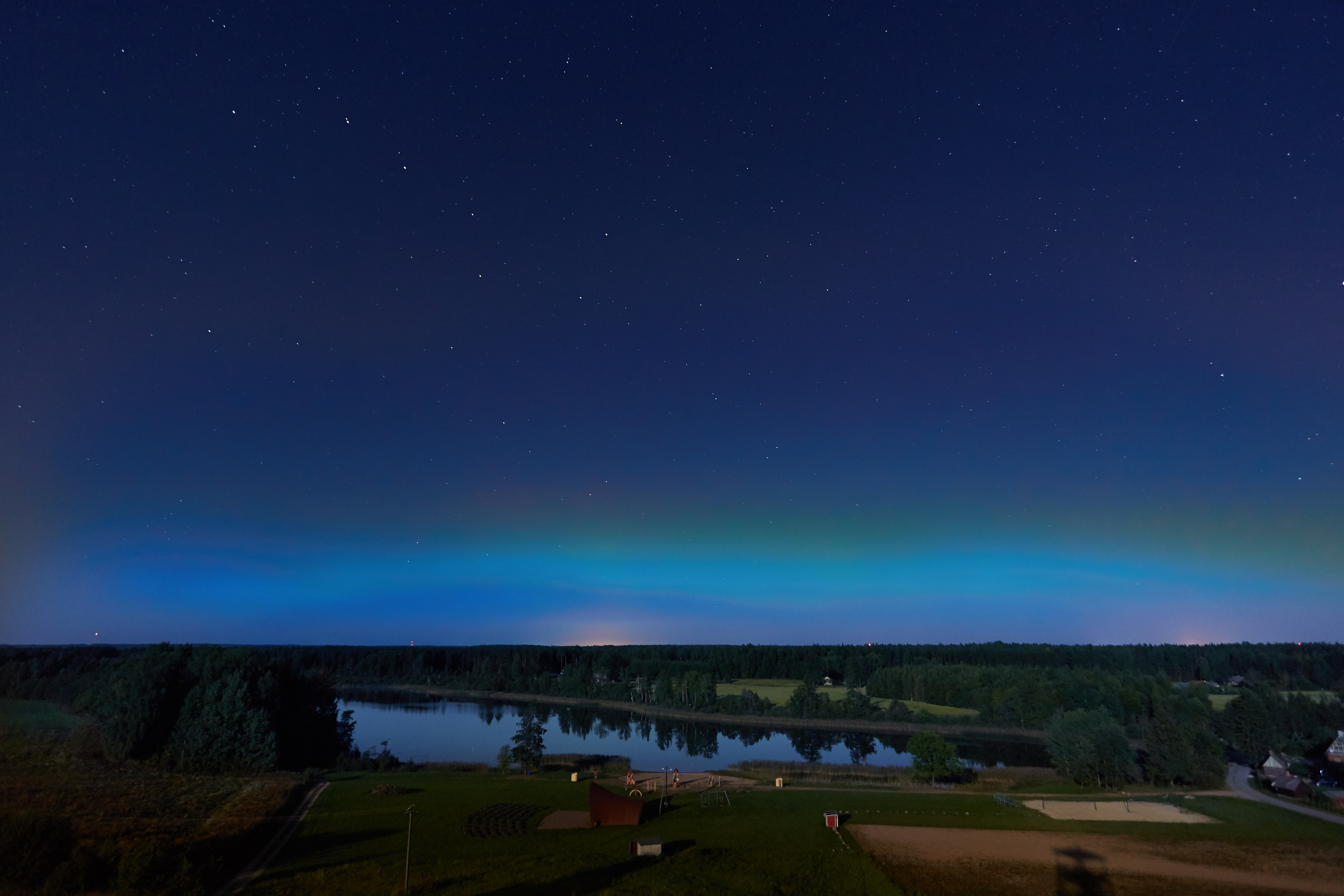
- Tilsi Kõrbjärv, one of the two lakes in Tilsi
- Interactive map of Tilsi
- Country: Estonia
- County: Põlva County
- Parish: Põlva Parish
- Time zone: UTC+2 (EET)
  - Summer (DST): UTC+3 (EEST)

Tilsi (German: Tilsit) is a village in Põlva Parish, Põlva County in southeastern Estonia.

== Tilsi Manor ==
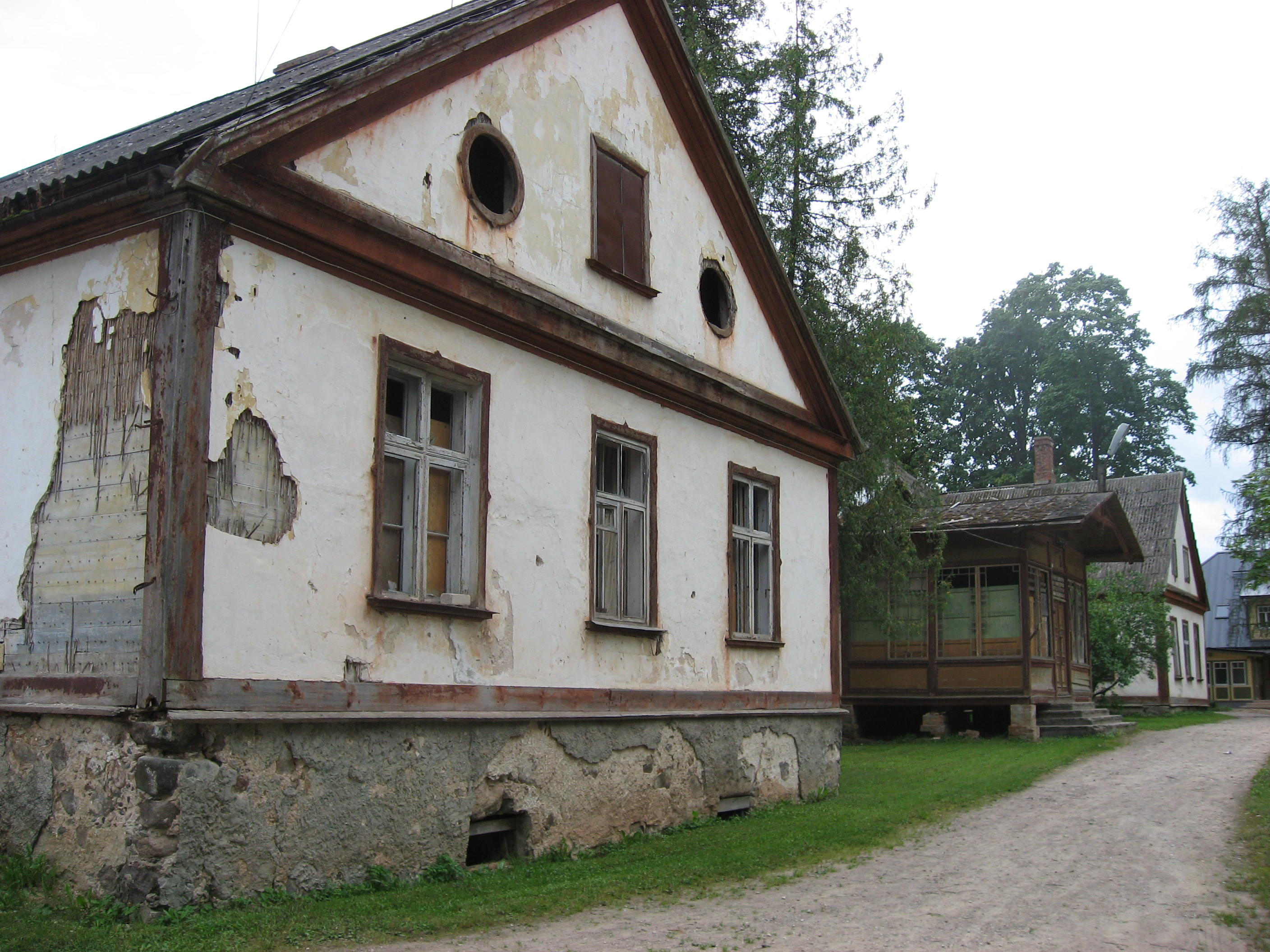
Tilis Manor, main building

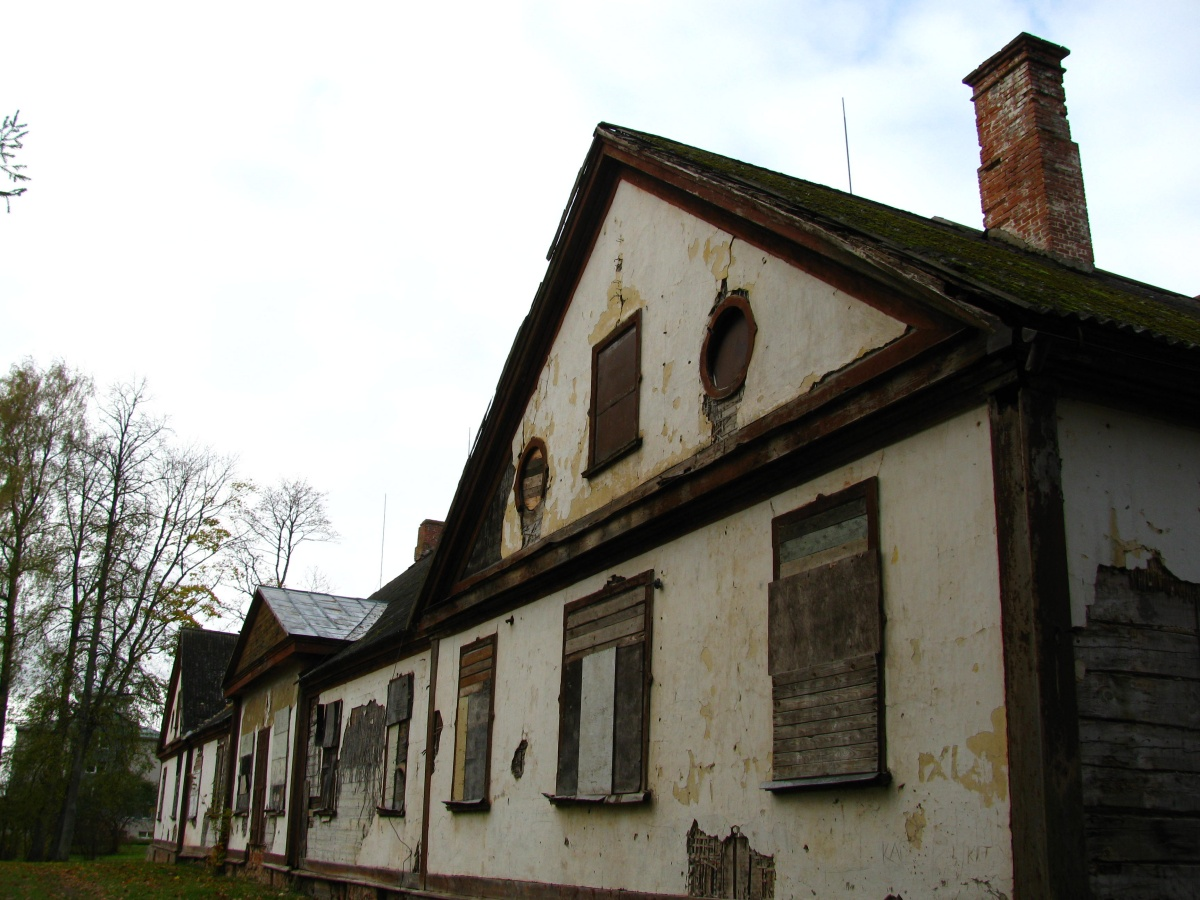

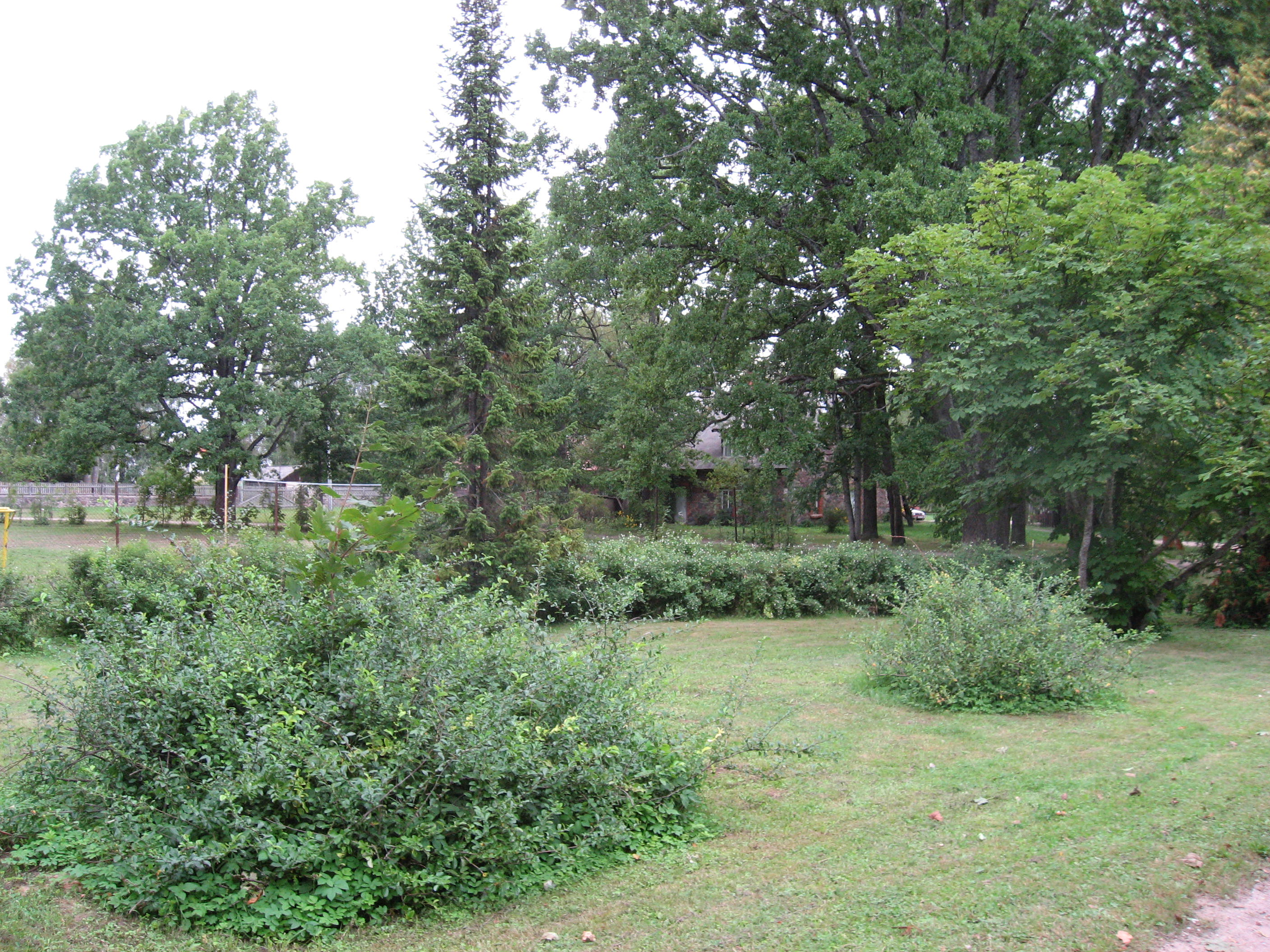
Park

== Notable people ==
Notable people that were born or lived in Tilsi include the following:

- Arno Niitov (1904–1989), singing teacher, and opera and concert baritone
