= BMO Capital Markets =

Global investment banking subsidiary of Canadian Bank of Montreal

- Company type: Subsidiary
- Industry: Investment banking Financial services
- Predecessor: Nesbitt, Thomson & Co. Burns Fry
- Founded: 1987; 39 years ago (acquisition of Nesbitt Thomson)
- Headquarters: First Canadian Place, Toronto, Ontario, Canada
- Products: Wholesale banking Mergers and acquisitions Market making Commodity products Foreign exchange Prime brokerage Private equity Securitization; Trade finance
- Revenue: ▲ C$3.724 billion (2014)
- Parent: Bank of Montreal
- Website: capitalmarkets.bmo.com/en/

BMO Capital Markets is the investment banking subsidiary of Canadian Bank of Montreal. The company offers corporate, institutional and government clients access to a range of financial services. These include equity and debt underwriting, corporate lending and project financing, merger and acquisitions advisory services, securitization, treasury management, market risk management, debt and equity research and institutional sales and trading.

== History ==
=== 1912–1999: Nesbitt Thomson ===
A.J. Nesbitt of Montreal and P.A. Thomson of Hamilton, Ontario established Nesbitt Thomson in 1912. After World War II, Nesbitt Thomson expanded its operations to include chemicals, salt, steel, ships, farm machinery, retail stores, and a transcontinental natural gas pipeline. Burns Fry is created from the merger of Burns Bros. and Denton and Fry Mills Spence in 1976. In 1987 Bank of Montreal acquires Nesbitt Thomson. In 1994 Nesbitt Thomson and Burns Fry merge to form Nesbitt Burns. In 1999 the merger of the corporate banking arm of Harris Bank, BMO Financial Group's Chicago-based subsidiary, and the U.S. investment banking capabilities of Nesbitt Burns, creates Harris Nesbitt. The new firm focuses on the middle market of the U.S. Midwest.

=== 2000–2018: BMO Nesbitt Burns ===
In 2000 the "BMO" brand was added to the Nesbitt Burns name in order to link the firm's corporate identity with BMO Financial Group. In 2003 BMO Financial Group acquired Gerard Klauer Mattison (GKM), providing Harris Nesbitt with a U.S.-based equity research and institutional sales and trading platform. GKM was founded in 1989 in New York as a boutique equity research and investment banking firm serving the institutional marketplace. In 2006 BMO Capital Markets was launched when BMO Financial Group's Canadian, U.S. and international wholesale banking capabilities were merged. In 2016, BMO Financial Group acquired the business of Greene Holcomb Fisher, a boutique M&A advisory firm based in Minneapolis.

=== 2019–present: SEC fines BMO Capital Markets ===
In August 2019 the US Securities and Exchange Commission fined BMO Capital Markets $3.9 million over its improper handling of "pre-released" American Depositary Receipts (ADRs). According to the SEC, BMO Capital obtained pre-released ADRs when they should have known that the pre-release transactions were not backed by foreign shares, and improperly obtained pre-released ADRs indirectly from other broker-dealers. Sanjay Wadhwa, Senior Associate Director for Enforcement in the SEC's New York Regional Office said "The SEC continues to hold accountable parties that abused the ADR markets over an extended period of time. U.S. investors who invest in foreign companies through ADRs have a right to expect that market professionals aren't gaming the system."

== Offices ==
=== Americas ===
- Atlanta
- Boston
- Calgary
- Chicago
- Denver
- Houston
- Mexico City
- Milwaukee
- Minneapolis
- Montreal
- New York
- Rio de Janeiro
- San Francisco
- Seattle
- Toronto
- Vancouver
- Washington D.C.

=== Asia-Pacific ===
- Beijing
- Guangzhou
- Hong Kong
- Shanghai
- Taipei
- Singapore
- Melbourne
- Tokyo

=== EMEA ===
- Dublin
- London
- Paris
