= John A. Hammond =

Canadian artist

John Hammond
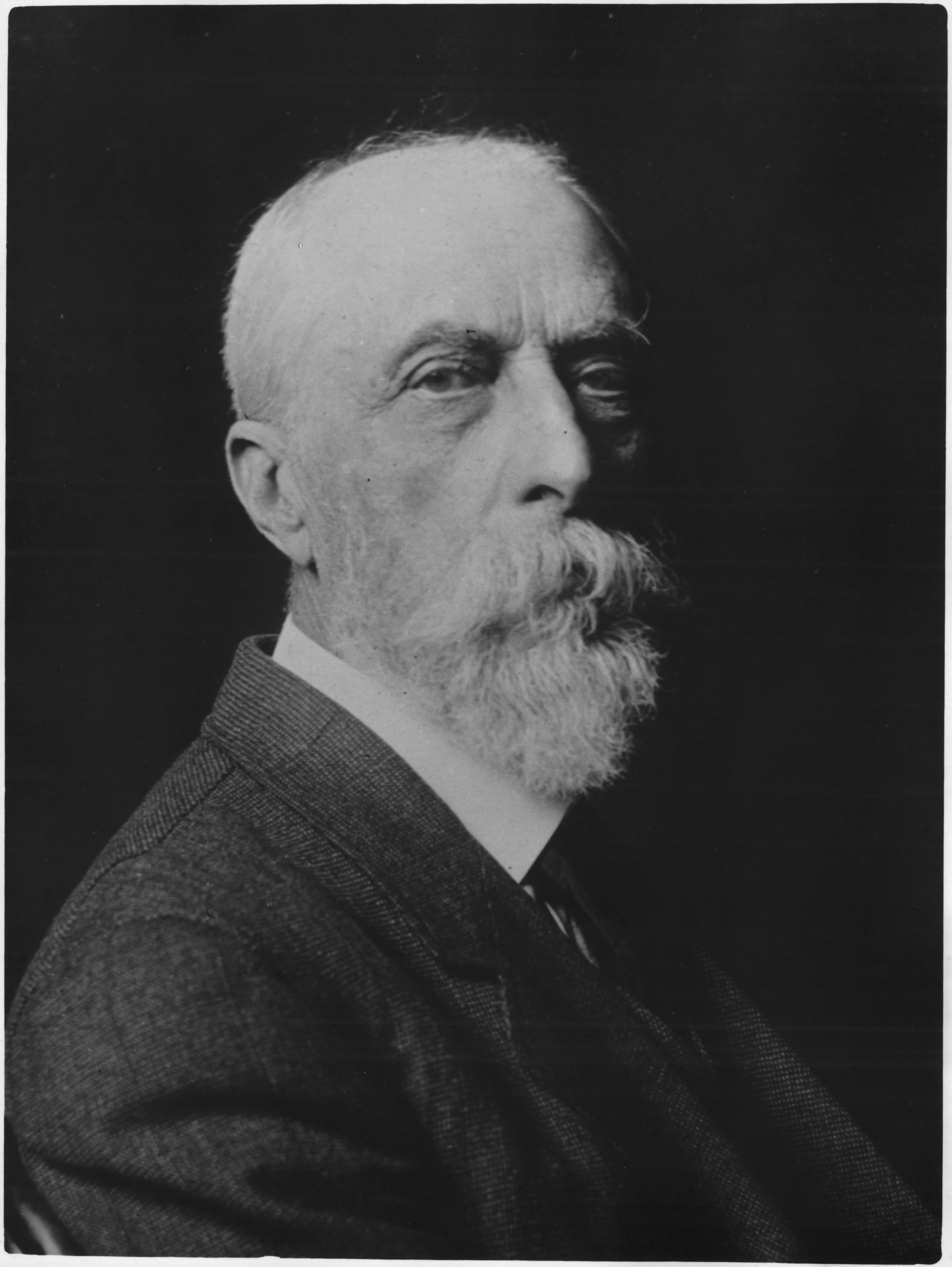
- Born: April 11, 1843; Montreal, Quebec
- Died: 1939 (aged 95–96); Sackville, New Brunswick
- Education: Staff photographer for William Notman
- Patrons: William Van Horne

John Hammond, RCA (April 11, 1843 – 1939) was a Canadian adventurer, photographer, artist, printmaker and art educator.

== Career ==
Born in Montreal, Quebec, Hammond began working with his father, who was a marble cutter, at age nine. As a young man, Hammond joined the local militia and was sent to counterattack an expected Fenian raid that never materialized. Seeking his fortune, in the 1860s he joined the Otago gold rush in New Zealand and spent three years searching for gold. After returning to Montreal, he trained and worked as a staff photographer for the renowned William Notman and joined the Geological Survey of Canada that laid out the route west for the Canadian Pacific Railway. His interest in painting was enhanced by his travels and after becoming a member of the Plymouth Brethren religious sect, his devotion to Christianity would sometimes be reflected in his art.

A member of the Royal Canadian Academy of Arts, Hammond traveled to Dordrecht in South Holland where he painted briefly with James McNeill Whistler, and in France he visited the forests of Fontainebleau and painted with the son of Jean-François Millet and others associated with the Barbizon school. In 1885, he exhibited at the Paris Salon. One of his paintings was illustrated in the catalogue. His works were also shown at a number of other important venues including the Royal Academy in London and the National Academy of Design in New York City. Today, examples of his work can be seen in collections of the National Gallery of Canada, Musée national des beaux-arts du Québec, Owens Art Gallery at Mount Allison University, and some of his photography at the McCord Museum. Between 1878 and 1892 he lived in Saint John, New Brunswick where he ran the Notman Studio there until 1884.

Hammond was a friend of the wealthy businessman and art collector William Van Horne who purchased some of his paintings. Van Horne was president of Canadian Pacific Railway (CPR) and he hired Hammond to create paintings and murals at CPR hotels and offices depicting scenes from the company's various railroad routes. Hammond traveled via steam ship to China and Japan but these influences are minimal in his art. Some of Hammond's best known works depict the Bay of Fundy, including scenes of the harbour at Saint John, New Brunswick with its ever-present fog.

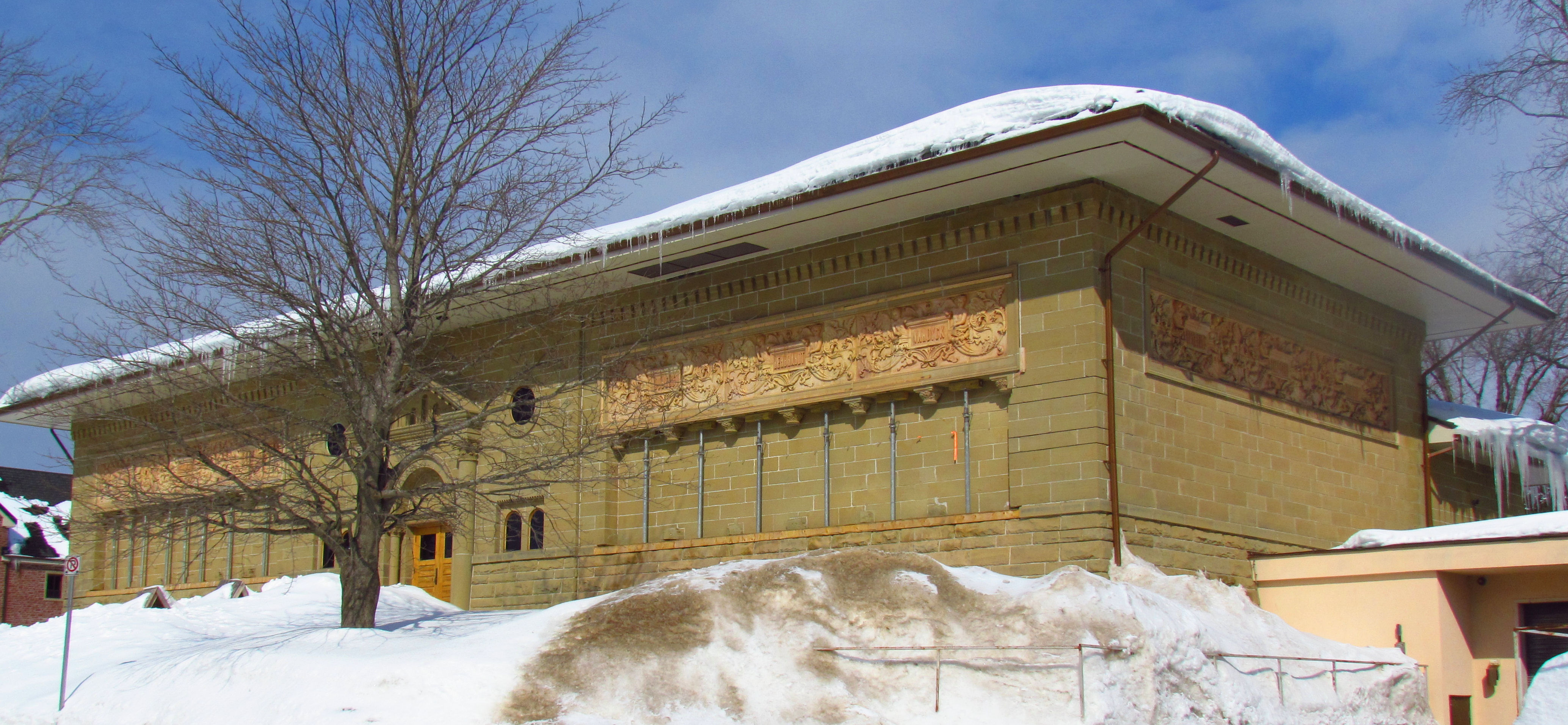
Owens Art Gallery, of which Hammond was the administrator

In 1893, Hammond was appointed Head of the Fine Arts Department at Mount Allison University in Sackville, New Brunswick and served as Administrator of the university's Owens Museum of Fine Arts. In 1904, he won a bronze medal at the Canadian exhibition at the Louisiana Purchase Exposition in St. Louis, Missouri.

In 1929, Montreal department store magnate and avid art collector J. Aird Nesbitt published "John Hammond : A Short Biography of Canada's Oldest Artist."

Hammond died in 1939 at the age of 96. The Hammond Gate at Mount Allison University was his design and is named in his memory. His house in Sackville was designated a National Historic Site of Canada in 1990. In 2002, the town of Sackville held a "Celebration of John Hammond’s Cultural Gifts" that included an exhibition of his paintings.
