= Arthur James Nesbitt =

Canadian businessman (1880–1954)

- Born: 19 August 1880; Saint John, New Brunswick
- Died: 24 October 1954 (aged 74); Montreal, Quebec
- Resting place: Mount Royal Cemetery
- Spouse: Mabel Ida Louise Aird (m. 1907)
- Children: James Aird Nesbitt; Arthur Deane Nesbitt

Arthur James Nesbitt (19 August 1880 – 24 October 1954) was a Canadian businessman and philanthropist. He was a cofounder of Nesbitt, Thomson and Company stockbrokerage and the Power Corporation of Canada.

== Biography ==
=== Salesman and Royal Securities ===
Born in Saint John, New Brunswick, Arthur Nesbitt first worked as a dry goods salesman, peddling products to area merchants. During the course of his travels he met Peter A. T. Thomson, a pickle salesman for the Canadian arm of the H. J. Heinz Company. The two struck up a friendship and would promote each other to their customers.

Nesbitt was hired by British newspaper magnate Max Aitken, better known as Lord Beaverbrook, to work for his Royal Securities Corporation stock brokerage. In 1906, after undergoing training in London, England, Aitken sent Nesbitt to open a Royal Securities office in Montreal, Quebec, the then financial center of Canada. Nesbitt prospered while working for Royal Securities.

=== Nesbitt, Thomson and Company ===
Nesbitt had remained in touch with his friend Peter Thomson, and in 1912 the two decided to open up their own stock brokerage, Nesbitt, Thomson and Company, with offices on St. James Street in Montreal and in Hamilton, Ontario. The business provided financing for the burgeoning mining and natural resource industries and underwrote stock and bond issues for the many new electric power generating companies that were springing up across the country. Nesbitt, Thomson and Company grew to become one of the largest brokerage houses in Canada.

=== Power Corporation and other holdings ===
By 1925, Nesbitt, Thomson and Company held major equity positions in a number of major electric utilities. The two partners established Power Corporation of Canada as a holding company for their substantial interests, with Nesbitt serving as its first president.

In 1927, Nesbitt purchased the Ogilvy department store in Montreal that his son James Aird would successfully run for more than 50 years. Nesbitt's second son, Arthur Deane, would follow in his father's footsteps at the helm of the family's brokerage/investment business.

== Philanthropy ==
Arthur Nesbitt supported various benevolent causes, including a gift to the hospital in his New Brunswick hometown to build a tuberculosis sanitarium for children, in memory of his parents.

== Personal life ==
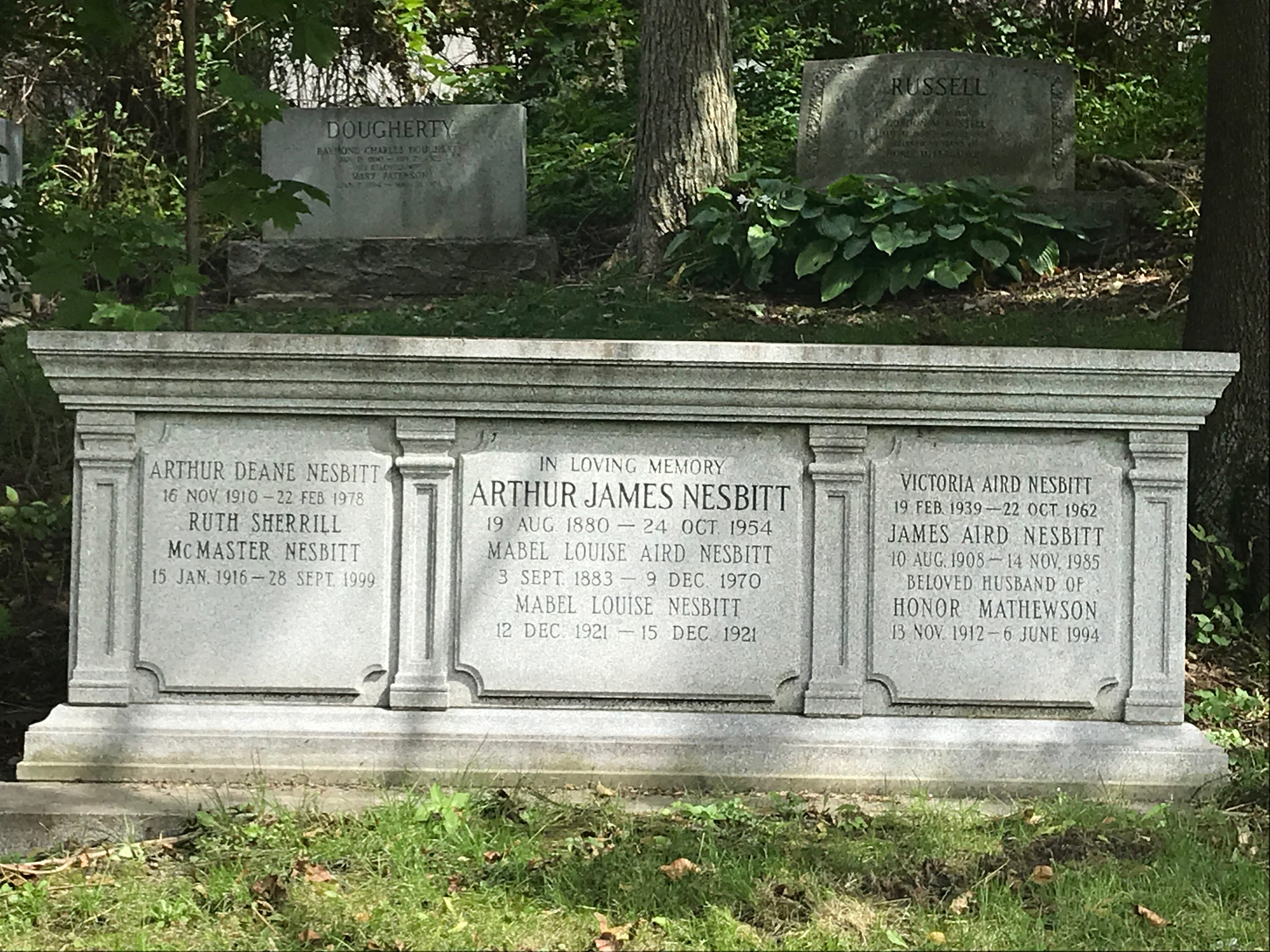
Nesbitt's funeral monument in Mount Royal Cemetery.

By 1910, he was married with two sons and had purchased a home in the Westmount area of Montreal.

On his death in 1954, Nesbitt was interred in the Mount Royal Cemetery in Montreal. In 1989 his grandson A.R. Deane Nesbitt published his life story, Dry Goods & Pickles: The Story of Nesbitt, Thomson.
