= John Jones McGill =

John Jones "J. J." McGill (June 22, 1860 – November 20, 1942) was an industrialist and philanthropist from Montreal, Quebec, and a prominent member of the English Speaking Community of Montreal. He was a major shareholder in, and later manager and director of the Dominion Oil Cloth and Linoleum Company at 2200 St. Catherine Street East in Montreal

He was born on June 22, 1860, in Montreal, Canada East, the son of David McGill of Lanarkshire, Scotland, and Jane Walker of Montreal. Following his emergence into business with Dominion Oil Cloth, McGill became the manager of the Canadian Rubber Company (later called the Dominion Rubber Company). He later founded the Durham Rubber Company in Bowmanville, Ontario, and the Dominion Belting Company in Hamilton, Ontario. He concluded his career as director of Canadian Linseed Oil Mills and St. Lawrence Flour Mills.

JJ McGill was also briefly the golf pro and president of the Royal Montreal Golf Club, once playing a round with Sir Arthur Currie, John Wilson McConnell and former British Prime Minister Lloyd George. He is the father of decorated athlete and Royal Canadian Air Force pioneer Frank McGill and philanthropist Gertrude Whitley (see Gertrude Whitley Performance Library)
