= Frank McGill =

Canadian RCAF marshal and football player

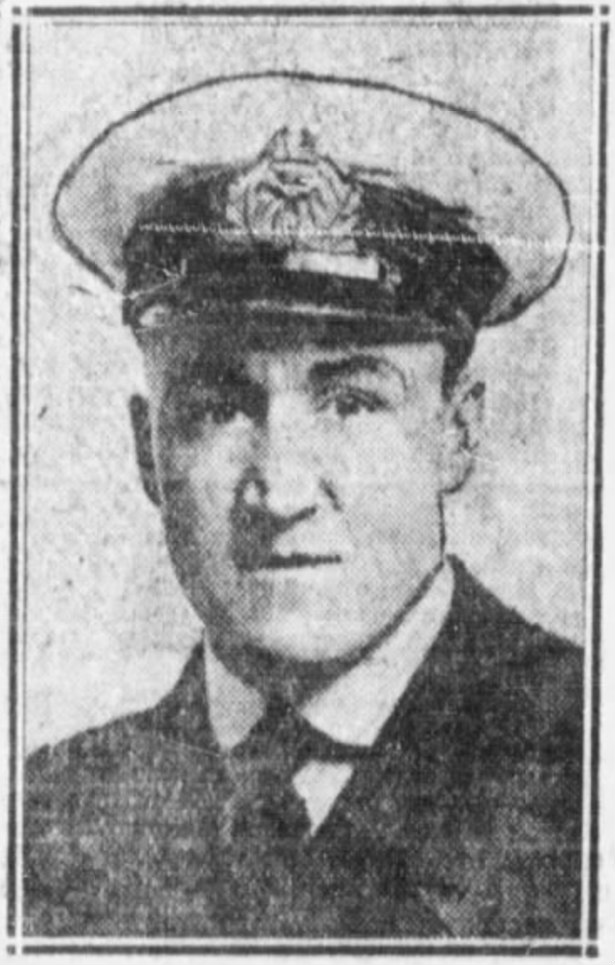

Profile
- Position: Quarterback

Personal information
- Born: June 20, 1894; Montreal, Quebec
- Died: June 28, 1980 (aged 86); Montreal, Quebec

Career information
- College: McGill University

Career history
- 1910s–1920s: Montreal AAA Winged Wheelers
- Canadian Football Hall of Fame (Class of 1965)

Other information
- Military career
- Allegiance: Canada
- Branch: Royal Canadian Air Force
- Rank: Air vice-marshal
- Awards: Companion of the Most Honourable Order of the Bath, Order of Lafayette, King Haakon VII Cross of Liberation

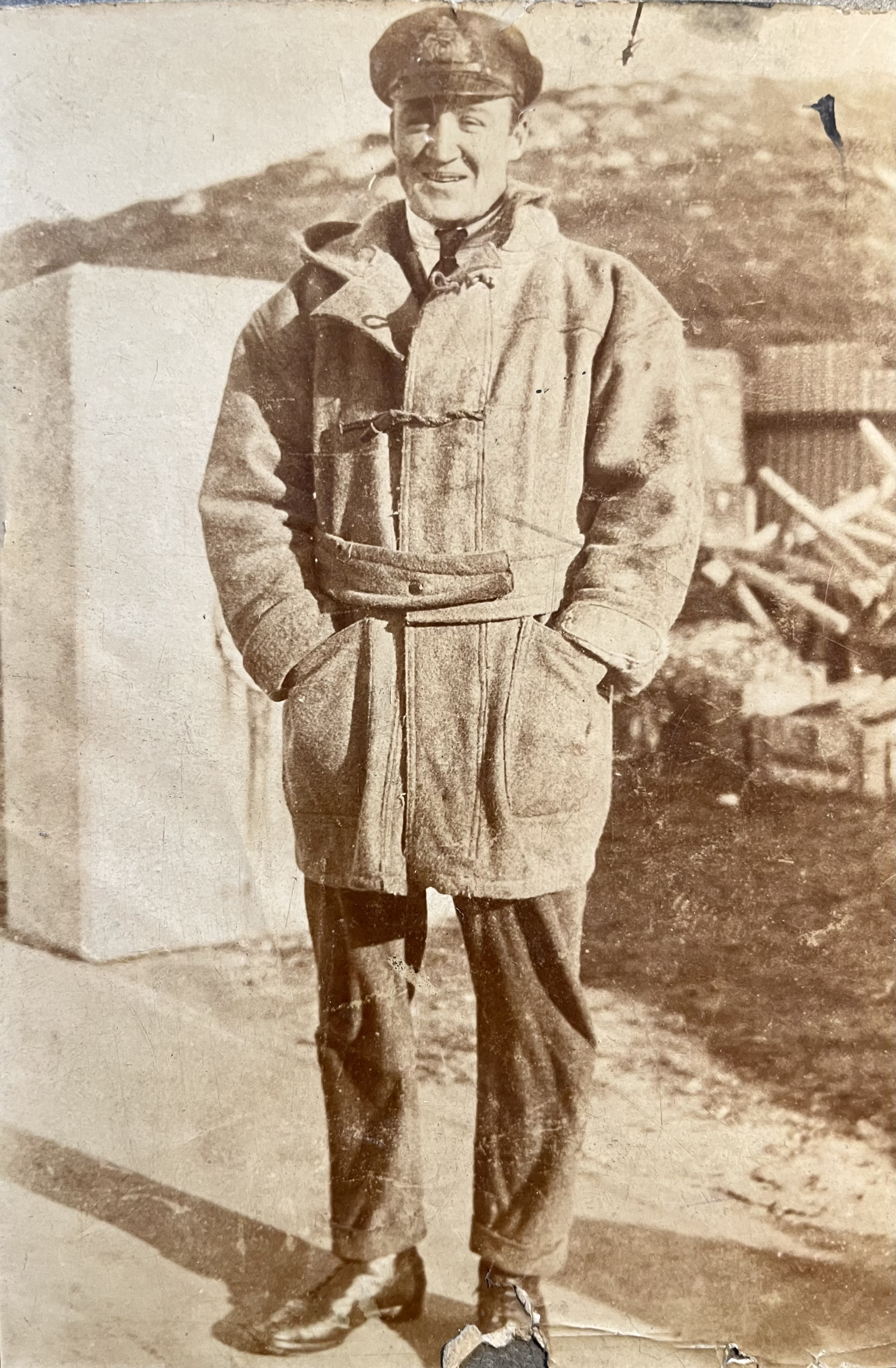
Capt. Frank McGill, Scillies 1918/19

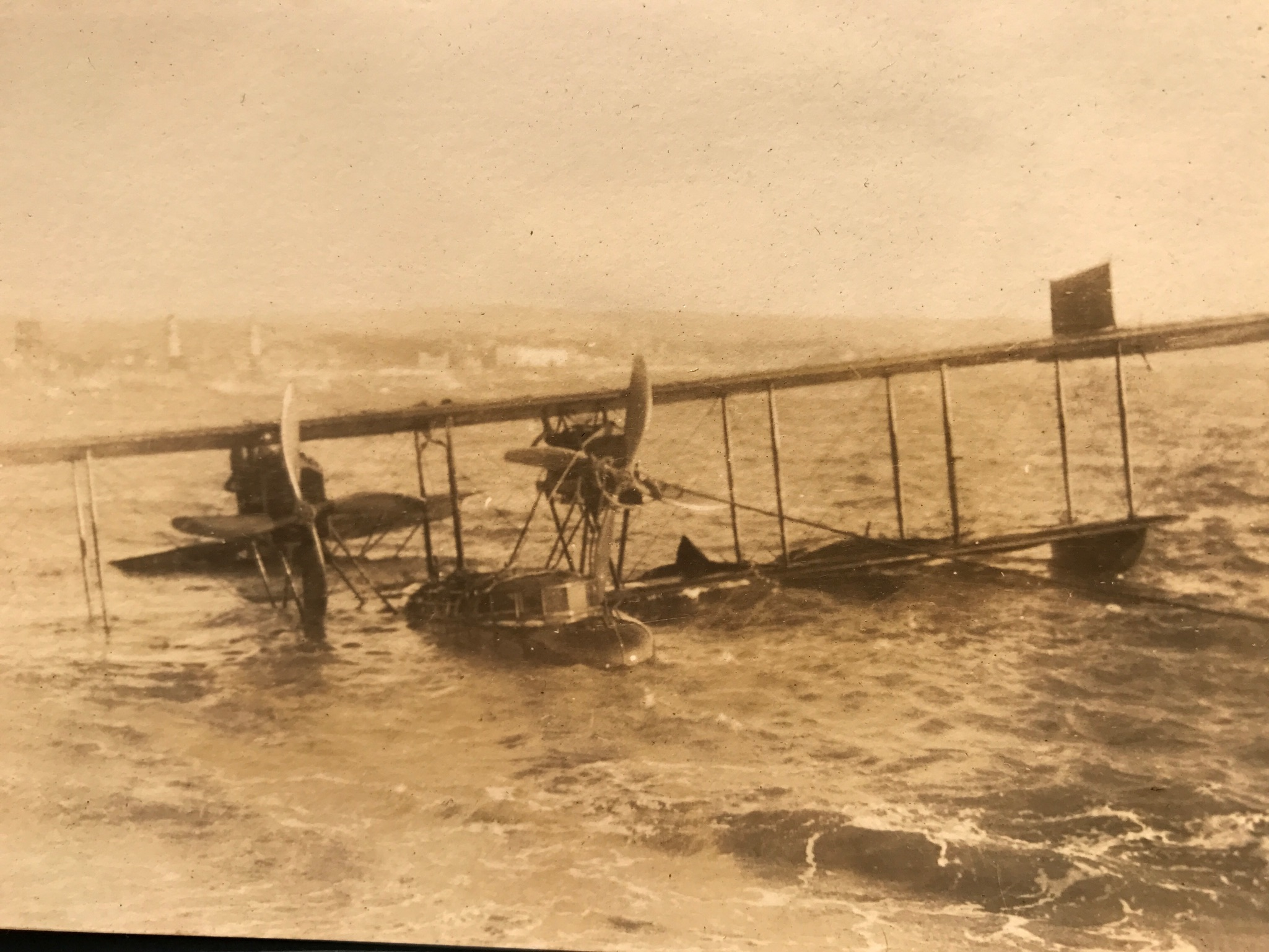
Sea plane crash, Isle of Scilly 1919

Air Vice-Marshal Francis Scholes "Frank" McGill, CB (June 20, 1894 – June 28, 1980) was a Canadian air vice marshal in the RCAF and a sports figure, amongst other things a football player in the Canadian Football League for the Montreal AAA Winged Wheelers.

== Sports career ==
McGill was born on June 20, 1894, in Montreal, Quebec to John Jones McGill and Eliza Jane Bryson. He played college football at McGill University, where he also starred at hockey, water polo and swimming. He was inducted into the Canadian Football Hall of Fame in 1965 and into the Canada's Sports Hall of Fame in 1959.

== Military career ==
Frank McGill served in First World War as a pilot for the Royal Naval Air Service, after graduating from McGill in 1913. At the outbreak of War in 1914, a brief period in the Army training corps found McGill extremely bored, following which he promptly joined the Royal Naval Air Service. During the First World War he served in combat and as a test pilot, and was decorated for his Royal Flying Corps work. In 1915 while flying with an instructor over the Thames estuary, McGill's plane crashed, resulting in a fractured arm and stay in the Royal Naval Hospital. In 1917 he was appointed second-in-command to a small flying boat force in the Scilly Isles, England.

In February 1919 Capt. McGill was the 1st Pilot in a flying boat that crashed in poor weather off Newlyn in Cornwall. Capt. McGill saved the life of 2nd Lt. HD Morley. The two remained in correspondence until the death of HD Morley in 1978.

During the inter-war period, Air Vice Marshal McGill organized and led an RCAF squadron which eventually became the country's primary fighter unit and participated in the Battle of Britain. He played a founding role in the development of the Commonwealth Air Training Plan, as well as serving as the first commanding officer of Uplands and Trenton airforce bases.

In September 1939 Wing Commander McGill was called up to active service. He was the commanding officer of no. 1 Service Flying Training School at Camp Borden, and during 1940–1941 he was organizer and first commanding officer of no. 2 Service Flying Training School at Uplands. Further postings followed as Director of Postings and Records in 1941 to Air Force Headquarters, and as commanding officer to No. 2 (Movements) Group Headquarters at Halifax in 1941-1942 and to RCAF Station Trenton in 1942.

In 1943, he was promoted Air Commodore and given command of No. 2 Training command in Toronto. Following another promotion to Air Vice Marshal, he returned to Air Force Headquarters in December 1943, where he remained for the rest of the war as Air Member for Organization, later Air Member for Supply and Organization. McGill retired from the RCAF in 1946. From 1951 to 1961 he was Director of the Aircraft Production branch of the Department of Defence Production. He died in Montreal on June 28, 1980.

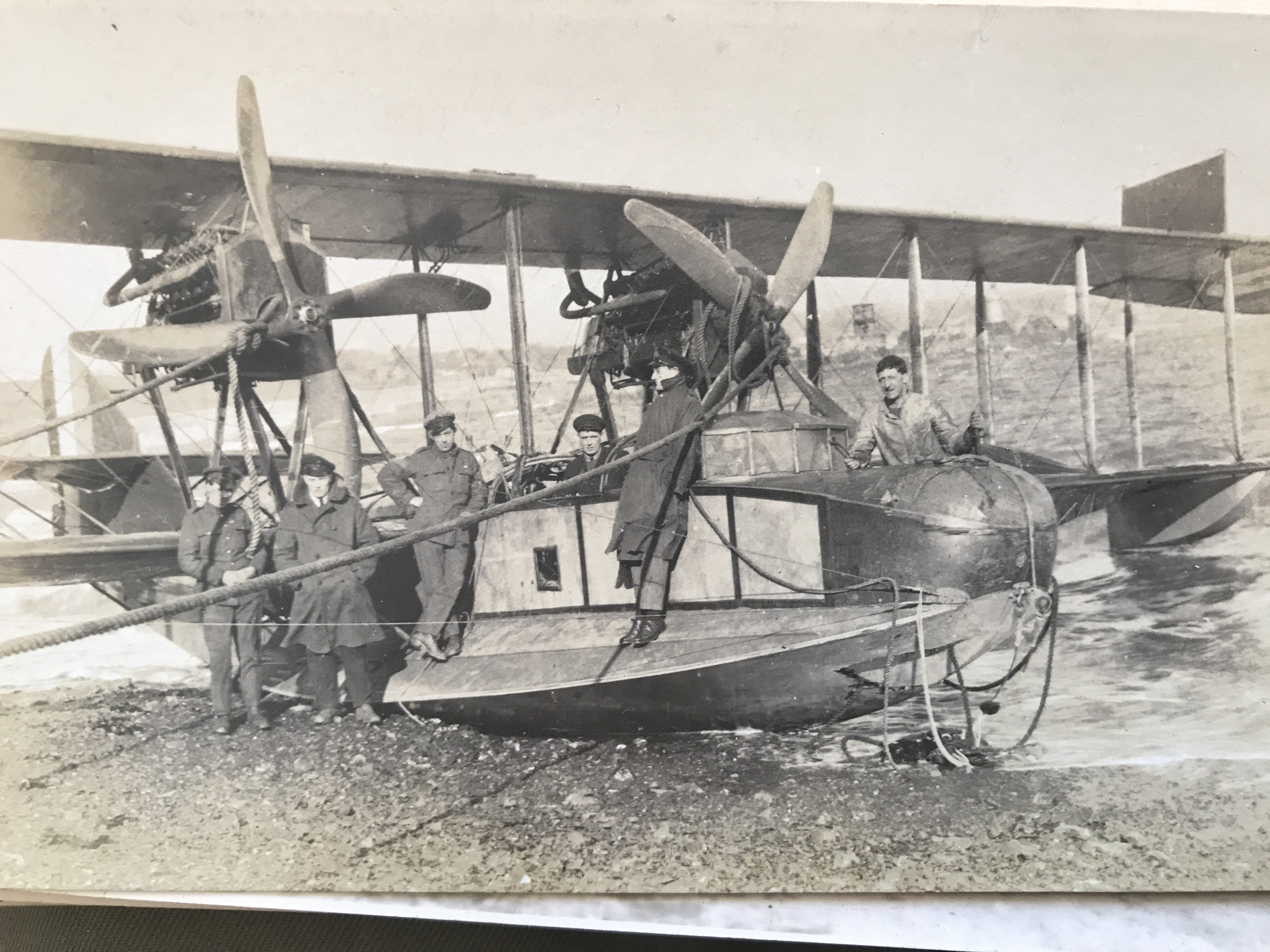
Photo of the crash of 1919

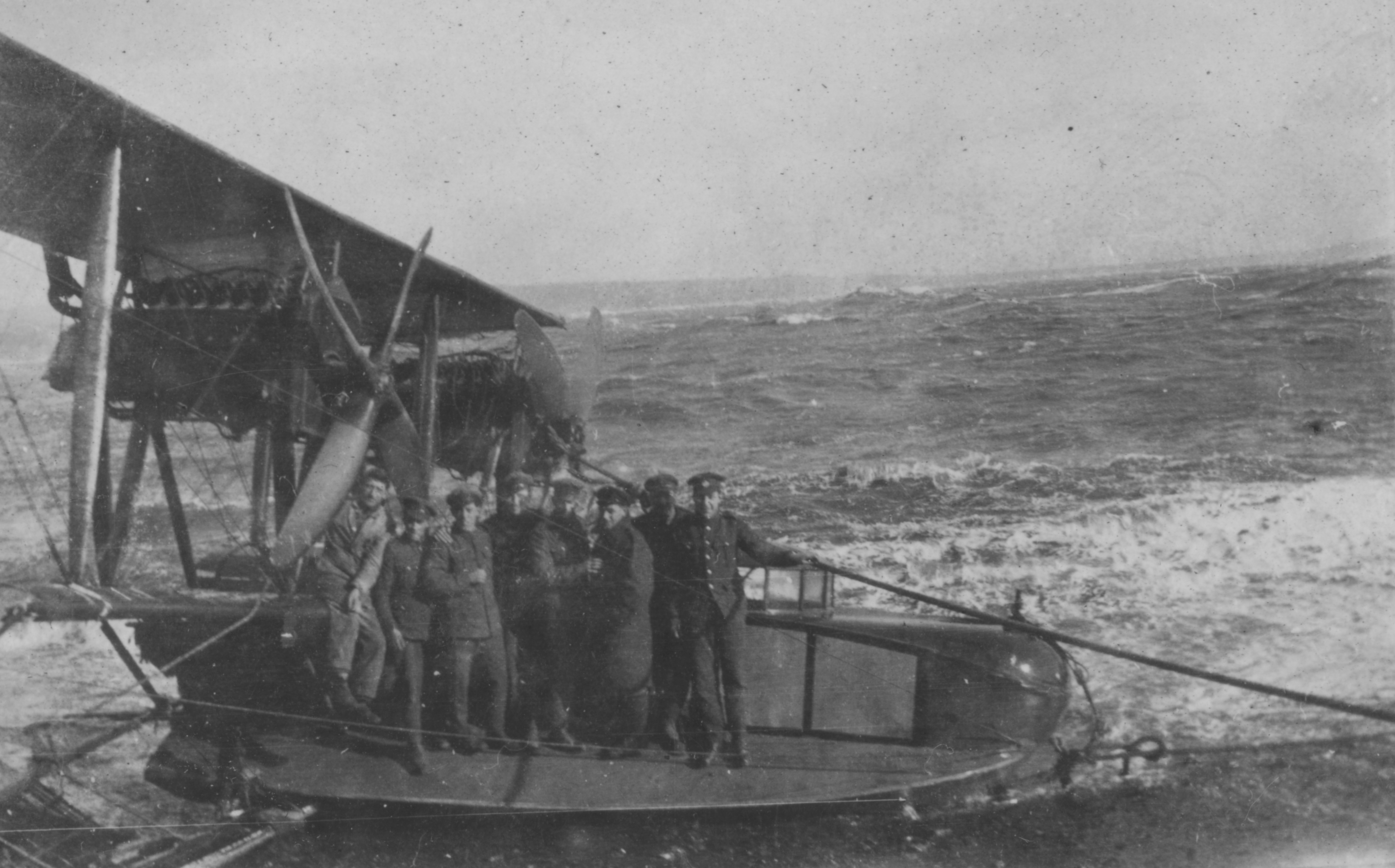
Crashed seaplane from Feb 1919 Newlyn Cornwall piloted by Captain Frank McGill

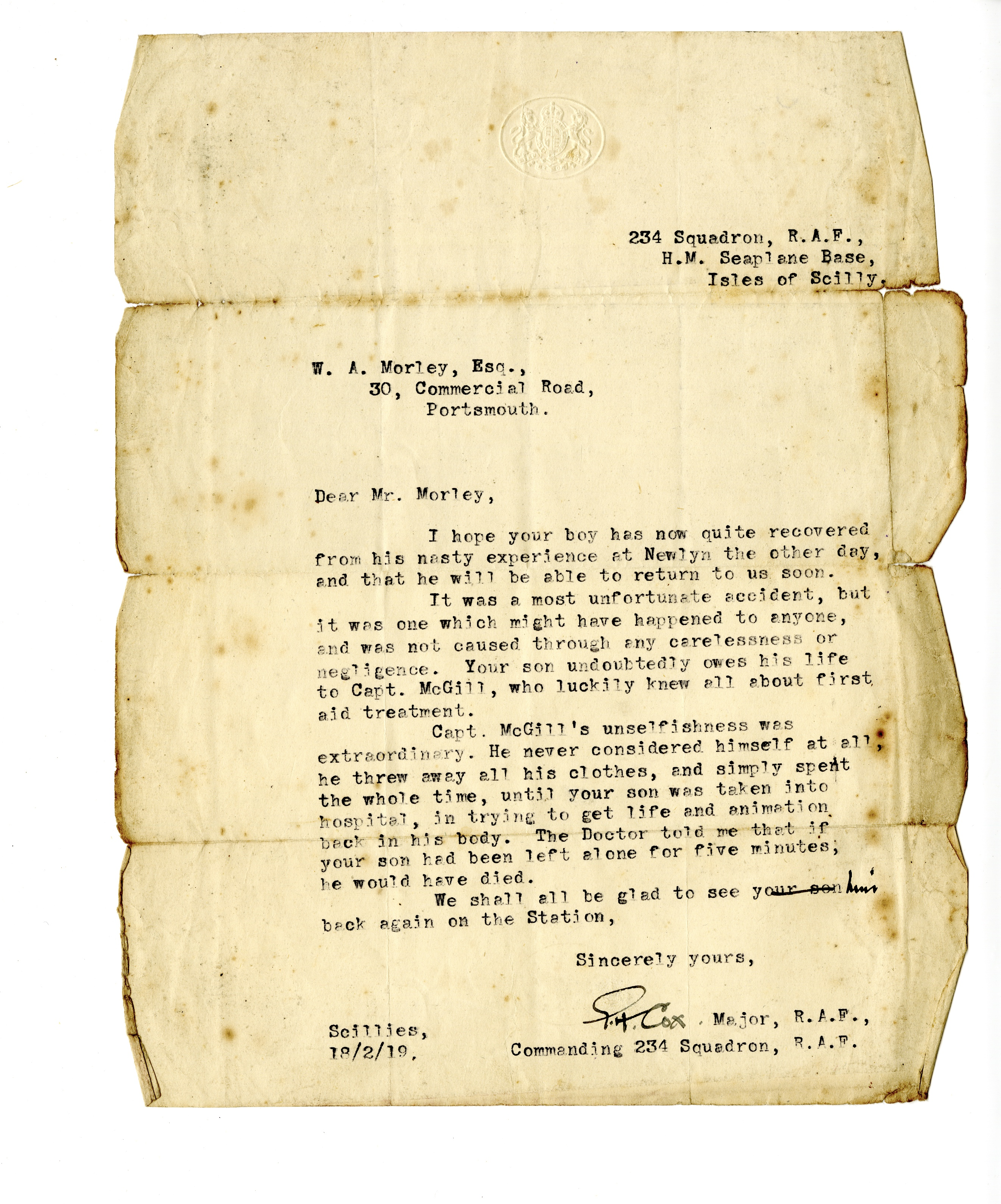
Letter regarding the conduct of Capt. McGill in saving life of 2lt HD Morley in crash of Feb 1919

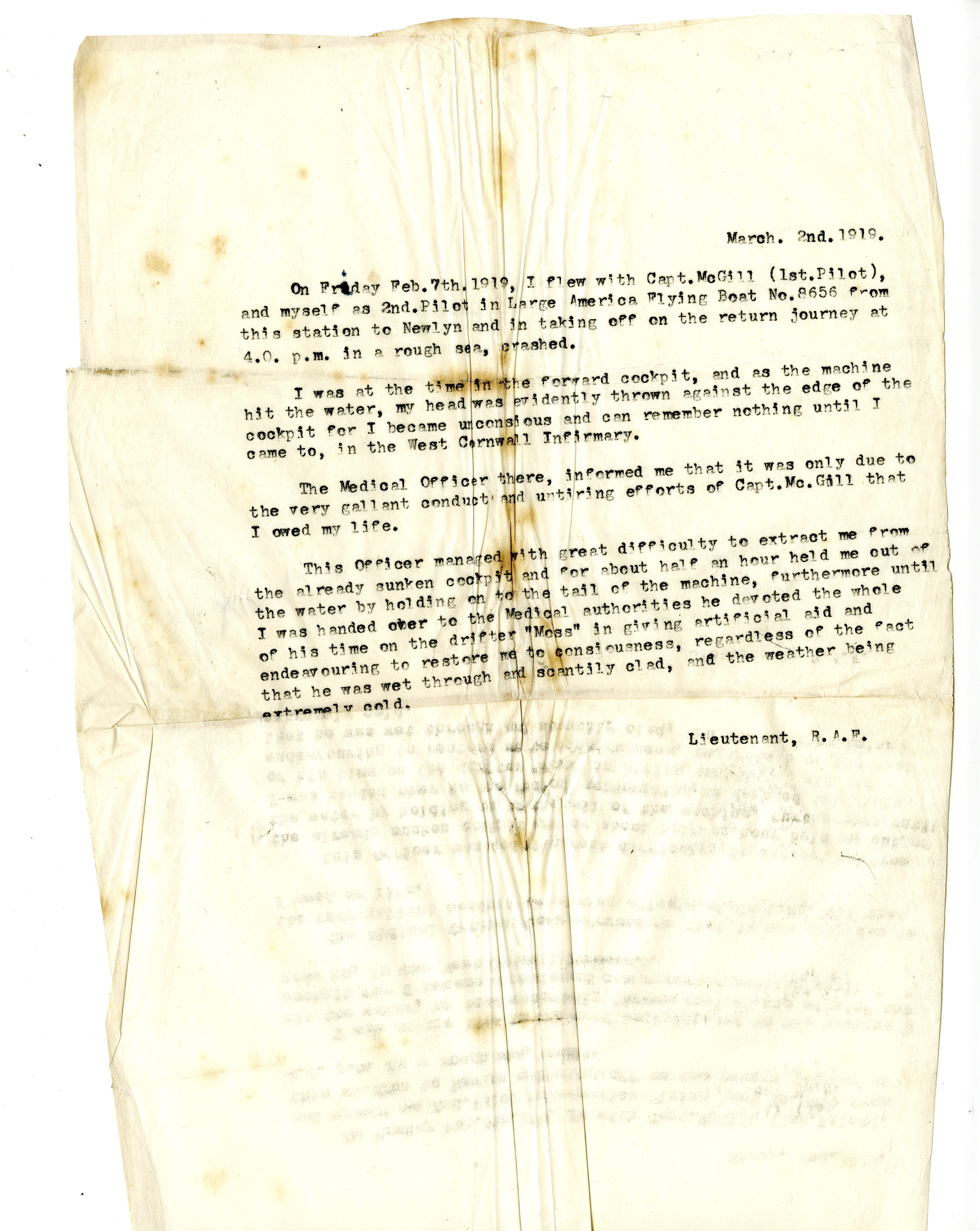
Report of Hubert Douglas Morley into the crash involving Capt. Frank McGill

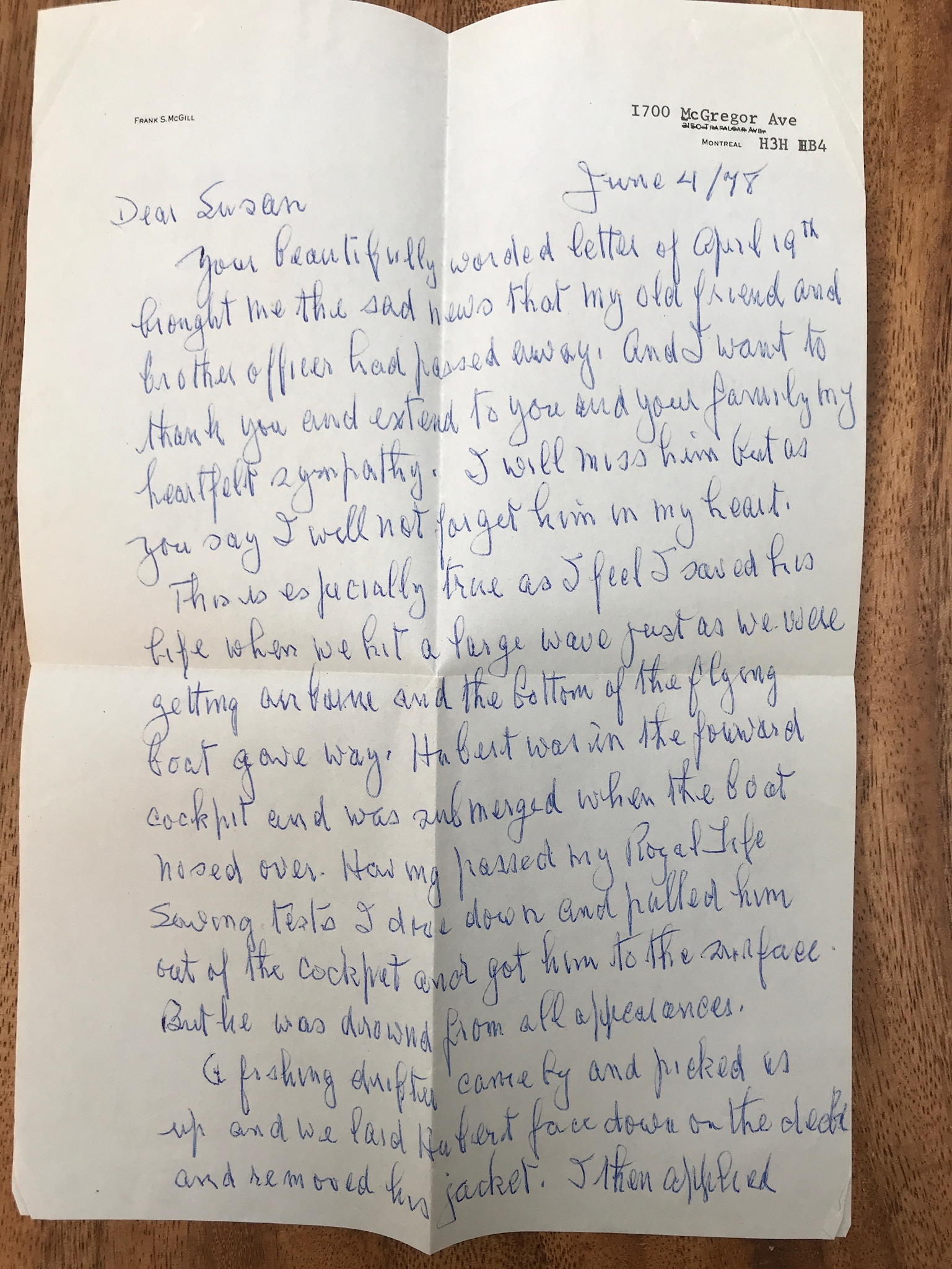
Letter from Frank McGill

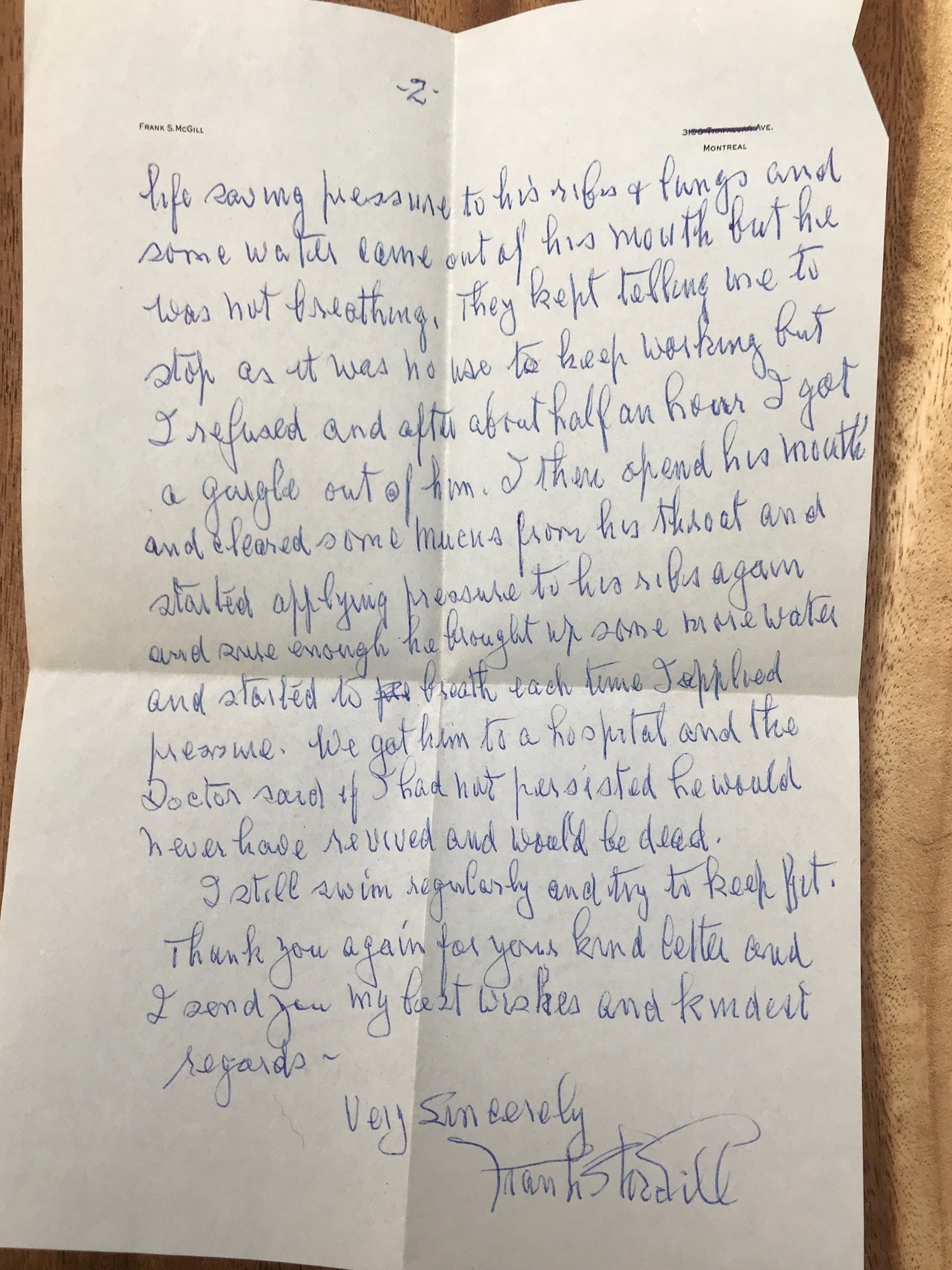
Page 2 Letter from Frank McGill
