= Montreal Engineering Company =

Canadian engineering company

- Industry: Engineering
- Founded: 16 September 1907
- Defunct: 1 January 2001
- Fate: Acquired by AMEC
- Successor: AMEC E&C Services Limited
- Headquarters: Montreal, Quebec

The Montreal Engineering Company Limited, and from 1985 onwards Monenco, was a Canadian engineering services company operating in the energy and infrastructure utilities area.

The company became an important player in North and Latin America and elsewhere, such as the feasibility study and design of the Diamer-Bhasha Dam, and Jebba Hydroelectric Power Station respectively. The company was also involved in the ill-fated World War 2 experiment Project Habakkuk.

== History ==
In 1907 a department of the Royal Securities Corporation with three staff members was spun out into the Montreal Engineering Company Ltd. In 1919 the company became part of the portfolio of financier Izaak Walton Killam whose expansion and acquisition of electrical utilities and other industrial concerns grew the company. After Killam's death in 1955 the company was bought by its senior employees.

After 1964 the company diversified from its core electrical power business, it became a public company in 1969 and was renamed Monenco Inc..

In 1992 the company was acquired by AGRA Inc. AGRA Monenco was subsequently acquired by AMEC in 2000.
