= Holt Renfrew Ogilvy =

Department store in Montreal, Quebec, Canada

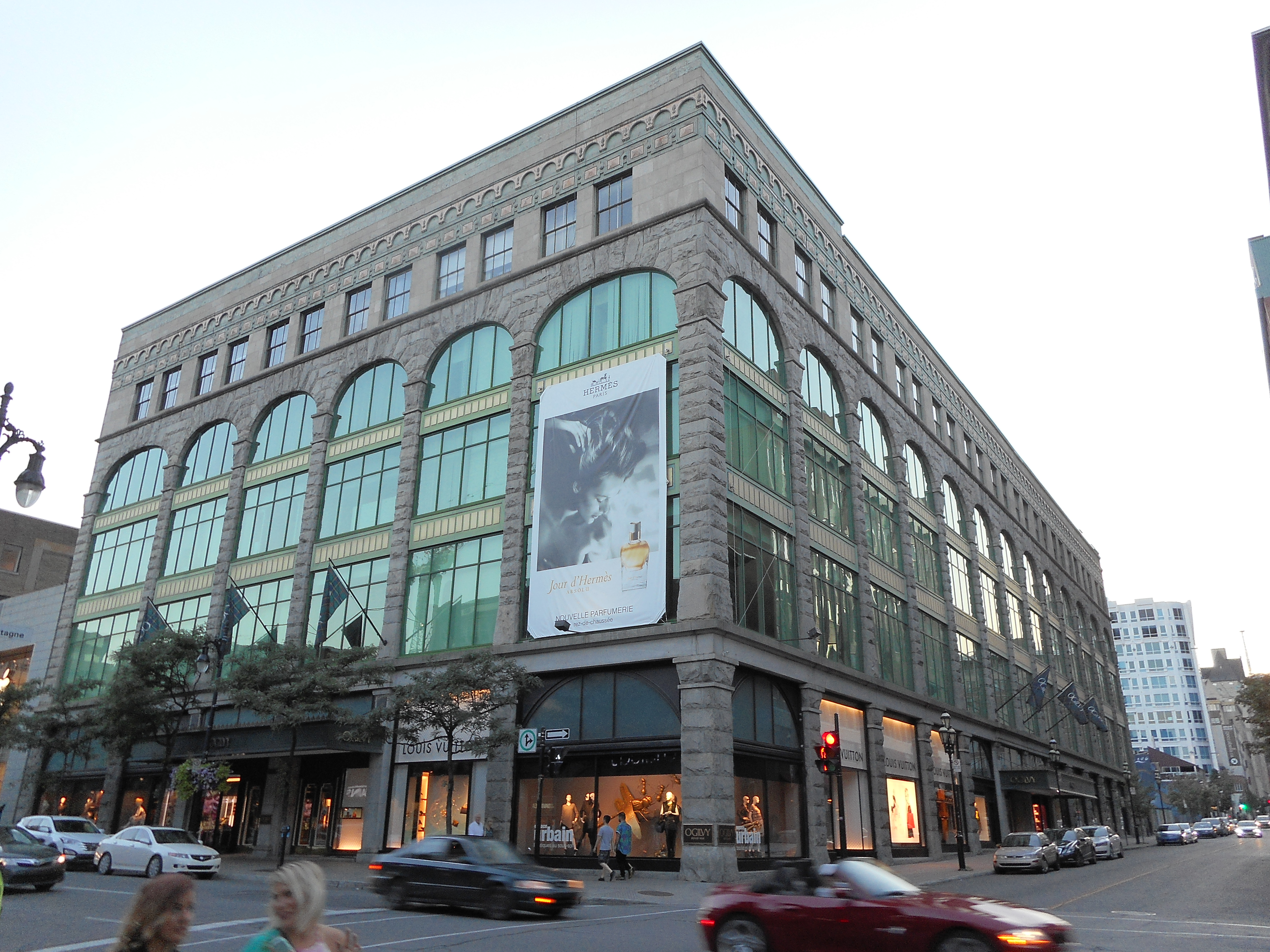
- Exterior of Ogilvy (2014)
- Former names: Ogilvy (1866–2019)

General information
- Status: Open
- Type: Department store
- Architectural style: Romanesque Revival
- Location: 1307 Saint Catherine Street West, Montreal, Quebec, Canada
- Coordinates: 45°29′52.2″N 73°34′31.1″W
- Current tenants: Ogilvy (1912–present); Holt Renfrew (2019–present)
- Opened: 1912; 114 years ago
- Renovated: 2017–2020
- Renovation cost: $150 million
- Client: James Angus Ogilvy
- Owner: Wittington Investments (Weston family)

Technical details
- Floor count: 6
- Floor area: 250,000 square feet (23,000 m^{2}) of selling space

Design and construction
- Architect: David Ogilvy

Renovating team
- Renovating firm: Jeffrey Hutchison & Associates

Website
- Store information

Holt Renfrew Ogilvy, formerly and still colloquially Ogilvy (French: La Maison Ogilvy), is a luxury department store on Saint Catherine Street West in Montreal, Quebec, Canada. It was designed by David Ogilvy for his father James Angus Ogilvy, and opened in 1912. The store was acquired by Wittington Investments (owned by the Weston family) in 2011, which finished renovating, expanding, and consolidating the nearby Holt Renfrew department store on Sherbrooke Street West into the Ogilvy building in 2020. It spans 250,000 square feet (23,000 m^{2}) of selling space, and is nicknamed the "grande dame of Saint Catherine Street" as the only one of four major west-end stores in the city to retain its original name.

Ogilvy originated as a dry goods store in 1866, and moved to the corner of Saint Catherine Street West and De la Montagne Street in 1912. It was a full-line department store by 1920, and today houses several store-within-a-store departments for luxury brands. It was also affiliated with the European department stores Selfridges, Brown Thomas, and de Bijenkorf until the Weston family divested of the Selfridges Group in 2022.

== Operations during 19th century ==
=== Founding ===
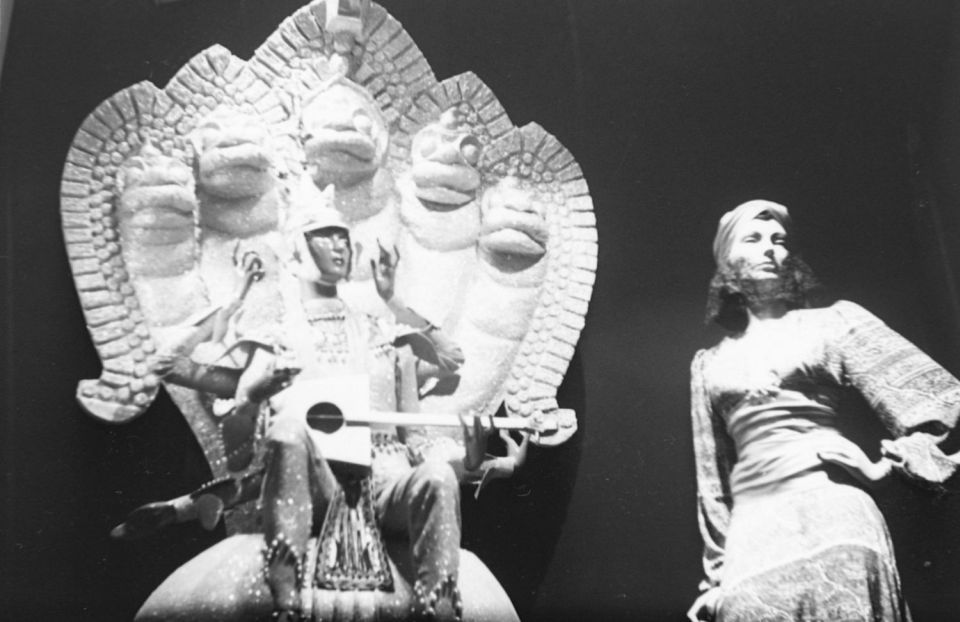
Display of a window at Ogilvy in 1941

In 1866, James Angus Ogilvy, a recent immigrant from Kirriemuir, Scotland, opened a wholesale and retail dry goods store at 91 and 93 Mountain Street in Montreal. Ogilvy is said to have started with a single counter and one employee. He remained at the same location for the next ten years until moving his "fancy and staple dry goods" business to 199 St. Antoine Street on the northeast corner of Mountain and Antoine. In 1884, Ogilvy relocated again, this time to the northwest corner of Mountain and St. Antoine. In 1889, James A. Ogilvy & Sons expanded its store to include house furnishings, household linens, and fine dry goods, in addition to serving as "agents for the celebrated Rob Roy Linen Fire Hose."

=== Move to Saint Catherine Street ===
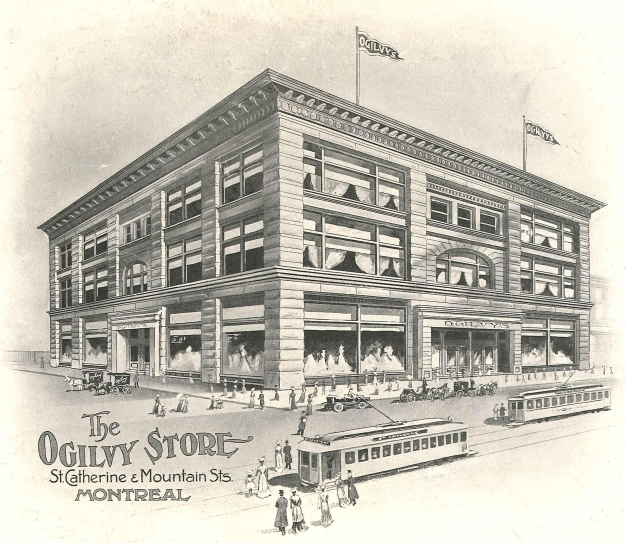
"The Ogilvy Store," St. Catherine and Mountain streets, Montreal, 1906.

In September 1896, James Ogilvy unveiled a new, larger, three storey granite premises, at the corner of St. Catherine Street West and Mountain Street. Designed by David Ogilvy, the proprietor's architect son, the store was described as "having every device known at the present time for the convenience of the public, the comfort of employees, and the economy of time." Amenities included a ladies' sitting room, detailed in cherrywood, and furnished with writing tables and chairs. In spite of the larger, more prestigious quarters, Ogilvy declared that his business would remain largely unchanged:

We came up to St. Catherine Street and mean business — a Dry Goods Business — only Dry Goods. A number of people have asked us if we are going into department store work. This we have positively refused to do. Our business is dry goods.

In fact, one of the company's mail order catalogues boasted that Ogilvy's was the "largest exclusive dry goods store in Canada", featuring "the world's best merchandise at the lowest possible price".

== Operations during 20th century ==
=== Move to new building ===
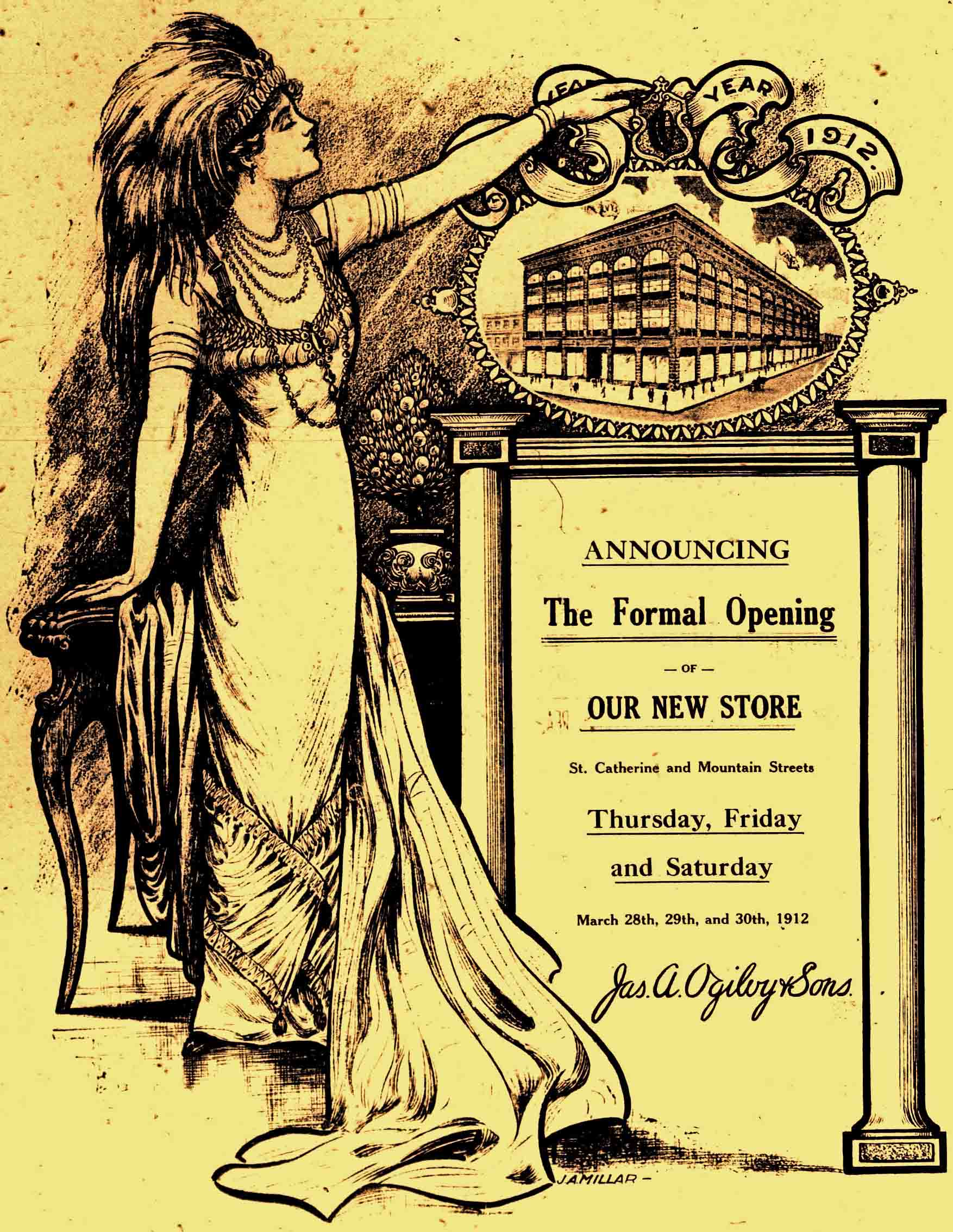
Grand opening of the new Jas. A. Ogilvy & Sons store, Montreal Daily Star, March 27, 1912

For the next sixteen years, the store remained at the northeast corner of St. Catherine Street West and Mountain Street. But with business expanding, Ogilvy bought land directly across the street and commenced construction of a new establishment in 1908. The four-storey, Romanesque Revival structure, again designed by David Ogilvy, and costing well over a million dollars, was formally unveiled in March 1912. Press reports noted the spaciousness of the new store and how "the accommodations are such that 1,000 people can be standing at the counters at one time and still have the aisle space for a couple thousand more people." Advertisements promoted the new establishment as "The Daylight Store" - an apparent reference to the abundance of natural light allowed by its many windows.

The company's founder, however, did not live to see the opening of the new store. James A. Ogilvy died the year before. Press reports referred to his "straightforward" character and "generous but never ostentatious" nature and how he was a major contributor to his church, as well as local charitable and community organizations.

=== 1920–1949 ===
By 1920, Ogilvy's array of merchandise and services had expanded and its policy of remaining strictly a dry goods business had changed. Jas. A. Ogilvy Limited now promoted itself as a department store that included amenities such as a "Hair Dressing Parlor" and a "Lunch Room." During this period, the store's ownership also changed hands and Jas. A. Ogilvy & Sons became an asset of the Home Bank of Canada. In 1927, following the bank's failure, investment dealer Arthur J. Nesbitt, of Nesbitt, Thomson and Company, bought the firm's entire common stock at $5 a share, for a total of $38,500, on the urging of his 19-year-old son. J. Aird Nesbitt hoped to quickly resell the business for a profit. Instead, he "fell in love with the place” and proceeded to manage Ogilvy's for the next 54 years.

As head of Ogilvy's, James Aird Nesbitt became a leading figure in Montreal retailing. Described as "an innovator and pioneer marketeer" who spent his career "ignoring the mass-merchandising techniques of the big department stores." Nesbitt characterized himself as "more showman than storekeeper." Soon after taking charge of Ogilvy's, he added a fifth floor to the building and opened Tudor Hall, a 300-seat oak-panelled music hall that featured an elaborate pipe organ. The venue hosted public concerts and shows, from Punch and Judy to performing baby elephants, early radio shows, including the first Montreal Symphony Orchestra across-the-country broadcast, and Canada's first experimental television transmission, aired in 1931. Other attractions included the world's fastest aircraft, a Vickers-Armstrongs Supermarine biplane, which in 1932 Nesbitt had dismantled and reassembled for in-store display.

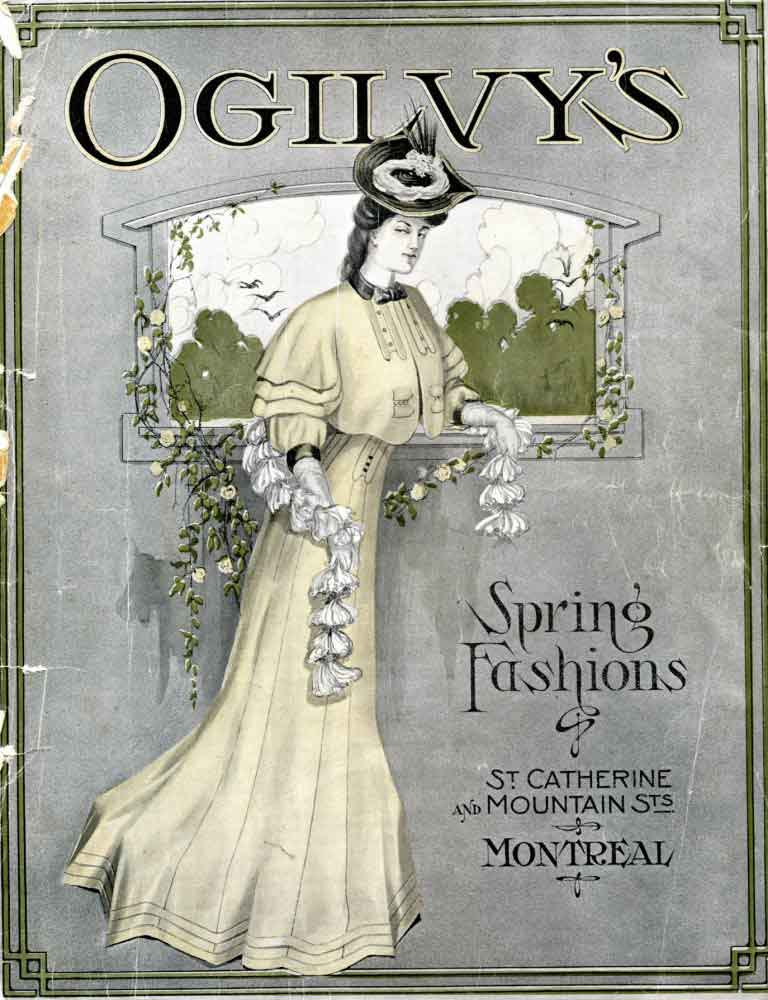
Jas. A. Ogilvy & Sons "spring fashions" mail order catalogue, Montreal, 1906.

Nesbitt also placed renewed emphasis on elegant interior design and chandeliers became a common store fixture. During the 1960s, he purchased the century-old, 100-light crystal Bohemian chandelier from Her Majesty's Theatre, Montreal, following its demolition, and put it on display on Ogilvy's ground floor, where it still hangs today. Nesbitt also established a policy whereby Ogilvy's would carry items that its clientele would enjoy, rather than merchandise only designed to make the most money:

We feel that the more fun we get out of merchandising ourselves, the more our customers will enjoy it, and the more successful we will be. Therefore, it is our policy to both choose in Canada and to import from around the world as many delectable and exciting things as we can afford, sometimes not worrying too much whether the things will be a big commercial success as long as they are a pleasure to have in the store.

Nesbitt paid tribute to the store's Scottish heritage, and his own, with the introduction of tartan shopping bags and store packaging. He also initiated the tradition of a Scottish bagpiper who paraded through the store, playing for the entertainment of patrons and staff. Beginning in 1945, the bagpiper closed the store at the end of the day — at first on Saturdays only but later on a daily basis. For the past several decades, though, the bagpiper has played at noon hour, winding his way through all the floors of the store.

Nesbitt was also responsible for the annual tradition of the store's Christmas window display. In 1947, he commissioned German toymaker Steiff to create two animated holiday scenes, known as "The Mill in the Forest" and "The Enchanted Village," made up of dozens of handcrafted mechanical toy animals, with more than a hundred moveable parts. In 2008, the displays, in a state of disrepair, were completely refurbished.

=== 1950–1999 ===
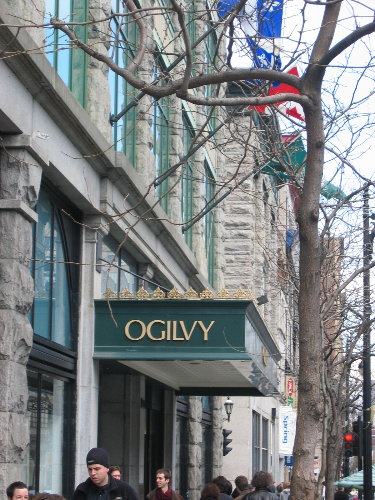
Ogilvy entrance on Saint Catherine Street

With the 1960s, the store was one of the first to use such contemporary expressions as "go-go" and "mod" in its promotional displays. It was also one of the first "to make use of the Chelsea look", associated with the miniskirt as it offered up the fashion of British designer Mary Quant. Ogilvy expanded into suburban Montreal with the opening of branch stores at Fairview Pointe Claire in 1965 and Anjou in 1968. By the 1970s, though, the store was no longer considered "the fashion leader", and was better known for its conservative clientele. Its profitability had also been on the decline. In 1976, it reported earnings of $81,000 on sales of more than $16 million.

In 1981, after more than half a century as Ogilvy head, J. Aird Nesbitt retired. Edward Walls, a former general merchandise manager with the T. Eaton Company, became the new chief executive officer. Among other changes, Walls expressed his desire to reduce the number of store departments from 66, which ranged from antiques to television sets. Four years later, after entertaining various offers, and asking for reassurances that "every reasonable effort" would be made to retain its retail tradition, the Nesbitt family sold Jas. A. Ogilvy Limited to Equidev, a Montreal development group led by real estate entrepreneur Daniel Fournier. The new owners undertook major structural and cosmetic renovations, which resulted in much of the store being gutted. A new retail format called the "store within a store" was introduced. Ogilvy was remodelled and transformed from a department store into a series of upscale shops and boutiques operated by independent retailers and brands, but under a common store policy. In November 1986, the first of the renovations, consisting of a completely redesigned second floor, were unveiled. It took two more years for the rest of the 150,000 square feet of retail space to be fully remodelled. The completed renovations saw 85 percent of the store's space leased to some 50 retailers. In 1994, Standard Life Assurance Company bought Ogilvy.

== Operations during 21st century ==
Ogilvy logo used until 2019

In 2000, the retailer again changed hands, this time acquired by Pyxis Real Estate Equities Inc. In 2004, the store underwent another remodelling at a cost of $12 million.

In 2010, it was bought by a Quebec-based consortium but within a year was sold again, this time to the Selfridges Group Limited, chaired by W. Galen Weston, a subsidiary of Wittington Investments Limited. Wittington's other holdings include upscale retailers Selfridges in the United Kingdom, Brown Thomas in Dublin, Ireland, de Bijenkorf of the Netherlands, and Holt Renfrew in Canada.

The intention to convert the Ogilvy building into a rebranded "Holt Renfrew Ogilvy" store and close the existing Holt Renfrew store on Sherbrooke Street West was first discussed in 2013. The renovation, which took place from 2017 to 2020, included a 3,700-square-metre (40,000 sq ft) expansion and brought the total space to 23,000 square metres (250,000 sq ft).

== See also ==
- List of Canadian department stores
