= Nesbitt, Thomson and Company =

Canadian investment brokerage (1912–1994)

- Industry: Securities
- Founded: 1912
- Founders: Arthur J. Nesbitt; Peter A. T. Thomson
- Defunct: 1994
- Fate: Merged with Burns Fry
- Successor: Nesbitt Burns
- Headquarters: Montreal, Quebec

Nesbitt, Thomson and Company was a Canadian stock brokerage firm that was founded in 1912 by Arthur J. Nesbitt and Peter A. T. Thomson. The firm was headquartered on St. James Street in Montreal, Quebec.

In 1987, Nesbitt Thomson was acquired by the Bank of Montreal, with Brian J. Steck appointed as President and CEO.

In 1994, the firm was merged with Burns Fry Ltd. to create the Nesbitt Burns Inc. entity now operating as BMO Capital Markets and BMO Nesbitt Burns, both wholly owned subsidiaries of the Bank of Montreal Financial Group.
