= Bank of Nova Scotia Building, Toronto =

Building in Toronto

Coordinates: 43.649243°N 79.379997°W

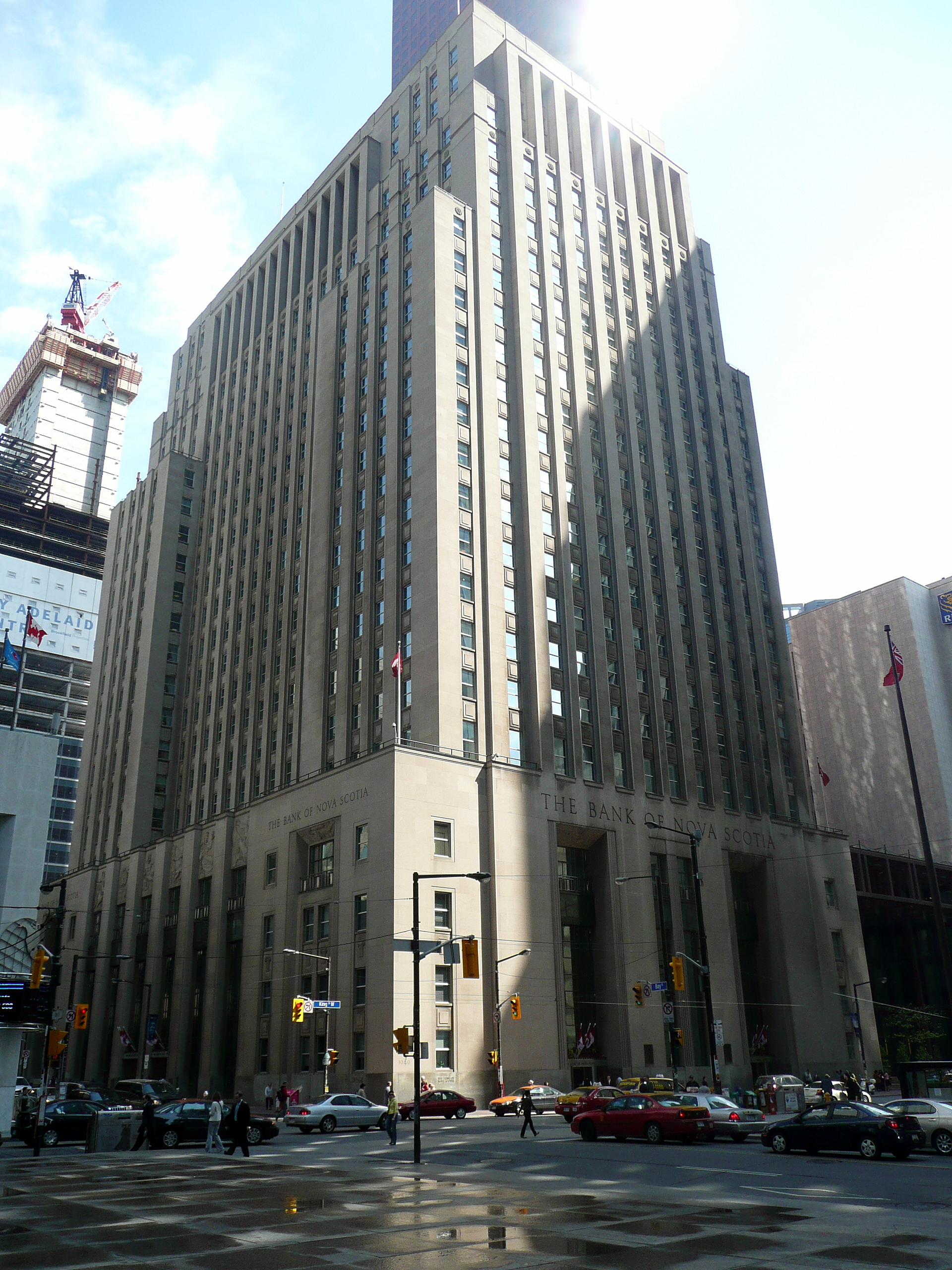

General information
- Location: 44 King Street West, Toronto, Ontario
- Construction started: September 1947
- Opened: 5 September 1950

Technical details
- Floor count: 25

Design and construction
- Architects: John M. Lyle; Mathers and Haldenby; Beck and Eadie

The Bank of Nova Scotia Building is a 25-storey office building in Toronto, Ontario. In February 1929, the Bank of Nova Scotia purchased the north-east corner of King and Bay from Canada Life and proposed to build a new general office building there in 1931. The bank hired John M. Lyle to design the structure, and he devised his initial plans by the summer of 1930. Lyle's original design was of a 23-storey art deco tower. Due to the onset of the Great Depression, the bank put off the start of construction. However, the bank's directors asked Lyle to rework the plans continually throughout the 1930s, which allowed the architect to keep his office open. At the outset of World War II, the bank shelved the project formally.

In the fall of 1946, the bank picked up the project again, however, Lyle had retired in 1943 and died in December 1945. The bank hired the firm Mathers and Haldenby to resume the project; they would work in conjunction with Beck and Eadie, two former associates of Lyle's who formed a partnership upon his retirement. Haldenby retained the concept and massing of Lyle's design, but removed much of the ornamentation and detailing. The result was a stripped classical design that was two storeys higher than Lyle's original plan.

Construction began in the fall of 1947, the cornerstone was laid in 1949, and the building opened in the fall of 1950. When it opened, the building served as the bank's general office and was home to its executives, while the head office remained in Halifax. In 1985, the bank began construction on the new Scotia Plaza, which connected to the old building. Upon the completion of Scotia Plaza in 1988, it replaced the old building as the bank's executive office.

== History ==
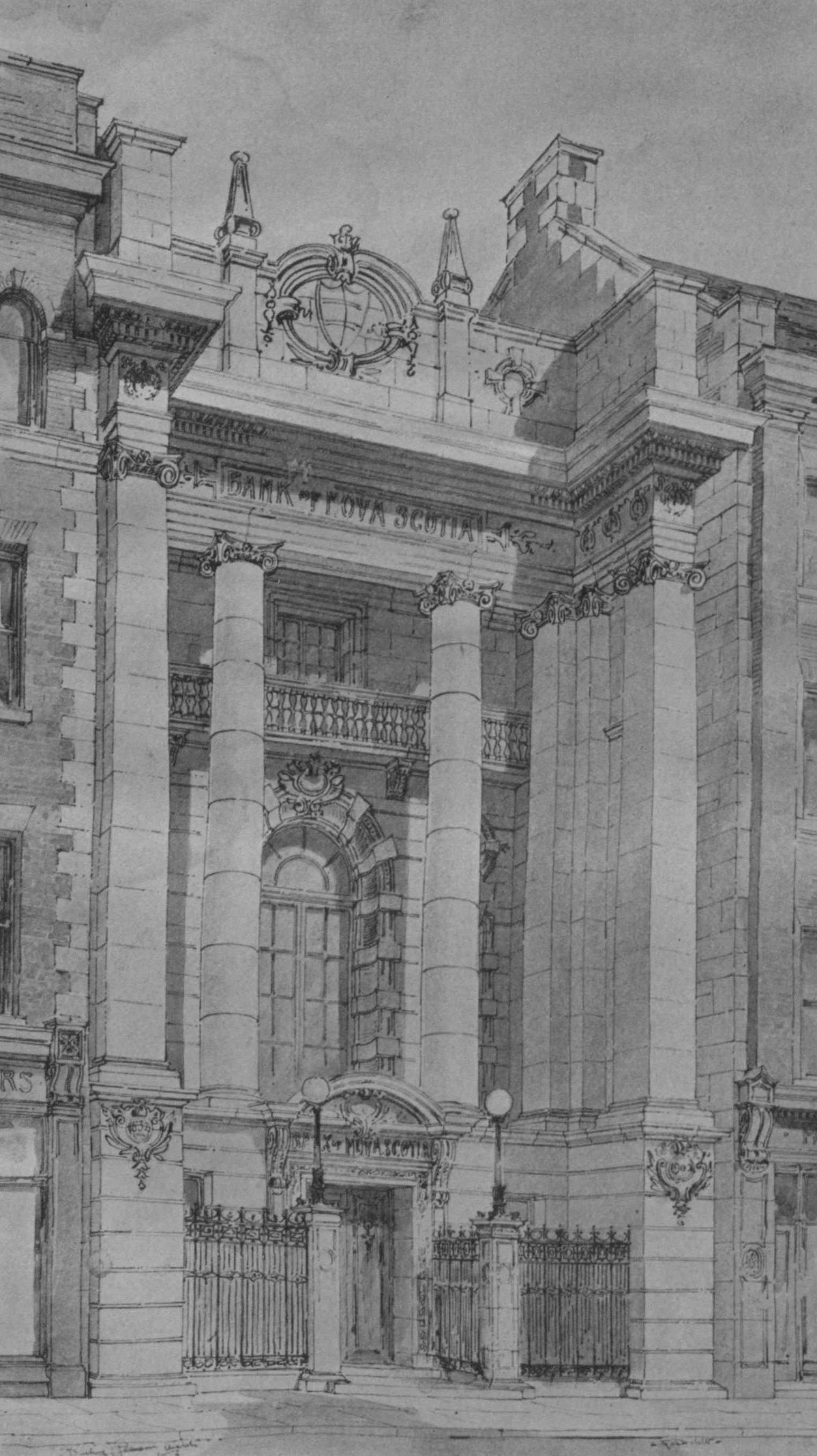
The bank's 1902 general office at 39-41 King, designed by Darling and Pearson. It was demolished in 1969.

=== The Bank of Nova Scotia in Toronto ===
The Bank of Nova Scotia was founded in Halifax in 1832. In 1897, the bank set up its first Toronto office in the basement of the Canada Life Building at 42 King Street West. In March 1900, it transferred its executives to the Toronto office. In April 1902, general manager John Andrew McLeod acquired two lots, nos. 37 and 39, on the south side of King to build a general office building of its own. In June 1902, McLeod approved the architectural plans by Darling and Pearson, and in December of that year, president John Young Payzant laid the cornerstone. The new general office opened on 25 April 1904.

=== Acquisition of the property ===
The origins of the Bank of Nova Scotia Building lay in the September 1928 purchase by Canada Life of a large property at University Avenue and Queen Street, where it would build the new Canada Life Building. The purchase confirmed that the company's current property at King and Bay would be put up for sale. In October 1928, rumours began to circulate that the prospective buyer was the Bank of Nova Scotia. By January 1929, Canada Life stated that "an imposing building that will be erected at King and Bay Streets when the Canada Life has moved up to University Avenue," although still it did not indicate which bank this would be. At the time, the Canadian Bank of Commerce was about to begin construction of the new Commerce Tower at King and Jordan. One rumour was that it was going to stop this work, change plans, and build on the Canada Life site instead. At Canada Life's annual meeting in January 1929, president Leighton McCarthy reported on the purchase of the site at University and said of the property on King that "your directors believe that it is not economically wise or necessary for an insurance company to occupy such a valuable site and position as they believe this site to be."

On 19 February 1929, the Bank of Nova Scotia announced that it had completed arrangements to purchase Canada Life property. The property the bank acquired had a frontage on King Street of 161 feet, and was 234 feet deep on Bay Street. While the sale price was not divulged, it was estimated to have been around $2 million.

The property the bank purchased comprised two main buildings: the William Cawthra House on the corner, and the Canada Life Building to its east. The Cawthra House had been built in 1852 and was designed either by Joseph Sheard or his partner William Irving. The Cawthras occupied the house until 1885. It was owned subsequently by the Molsons Bank (1885–1907), Sterling Bank (1907–1925), and Canada Life (1925–1929). Historian William Dendy said it was "without doubt the finest and most elegant town house built in Toronto." The Canada Life Building had been built in 1887 and was designed by Richard Alfred Waite. In 1913, Darling and Pearson designed an office building "for an insurance company" to be built on the site of the Cawthra House. Presumably, the building was designed for Canada Life.

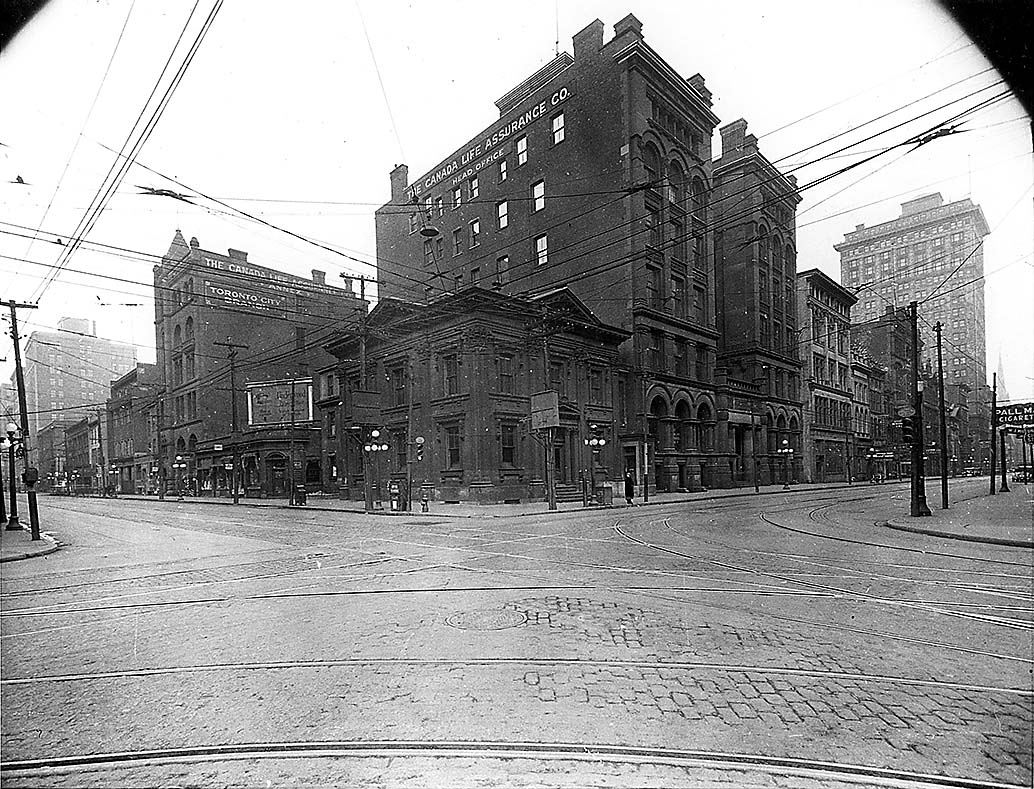
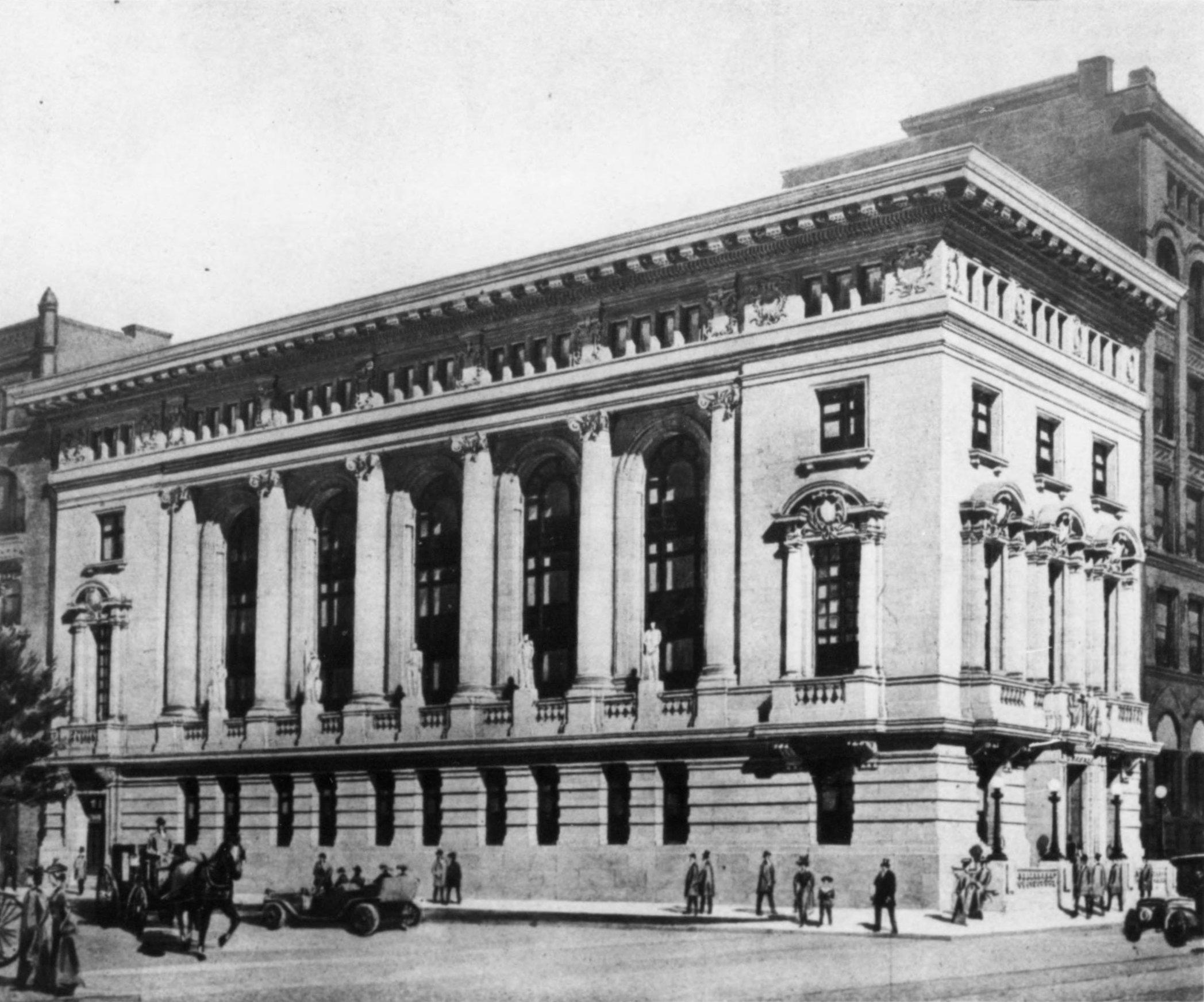
Two images of the northeast corner of King and Bay. The left image shows the Cawthra House in 1926 with the Canada Life Building beside it. The right image shows the proposed office designed in 1913 by Darling and Pearson.

After the purchase by the bank, there was significant consternation in the city over the fate of the Cawthra House. At the time of the sale in February 1930, proposals arose immediately to save the house and move it to a new location. In 1931, the Cawthra family, led by descendant Anthony Adamson, offered to finance the move of the house provided the city find a suitable site for it. Another proposal came from the Toronto chapter of the Ontario Association of Architects, which suggested the Toronto Public Library use the house as a branch. However, this proposal was rejected by chief librarian George Locke, who believed the building was unsuitable for that purpose. When the project ground to a halt later in 1931, the need to save the house was postponed. However, when the project picked back up in 1946, ideas of how to save the house began to circulate again. One was to relocate it to the property of the Art Gallery of Toronto, however, the gallery required someone else to pay for the move. Ultimately, no plans were successful to save the house. Dendy wrote, "the story of its destruction remains an object lesson in the need for strong, properly funded, architectural preservation legislation in Toronto."

=== Original design by Lyle ===
The 1929 University Club (top) was designed by Mathers & Haldenby with Francis Wilkes. It was based on Boodle's (bottom) in London.Despite the Wall Street crash of 1929, the bank allowed the project to proceed, as officials believe the crash would turn out to be a temporary correction. In early 1929, the bank hired John M. Lyle to design its new building. Lyle travelled that July with his associate John Arthur Hunter Eadie to New York to inspect contemporary architecture. The Lyle office made a detailed inspection also of the new Bank of Commerce building under construction across the street. In November of that year, it was announced that the contract had been given to the George A. Fuller Company of Canada Limited, and that demolition of the existing structures would begin around April 1931, when Canada Life moved to its new offices.

Lyle's design for the 23-storey tower was influenced by New York City's 1916 Zoning Resolution. To allow for more sunlight at street level, the resolution mandated building setbacks beyond certain heights. This resolution gave way to a revival of the setback in architectural design, calling back to ancient Egyptian and Mayan architecture. In his design for the bank, Lyle employed setbacks and steps at multiple levels. The building had a four-storey base and art deco motifs in its spandrel panels and columns. The entrance on King Street would lead to a large banking hall. Lyle decorated the building with stone carvings of Canadian motifs. The design was completed at the height of his nationalistic phase, and his ornamentation for the bank's contemporary buildings in Halifax and Calgary incorporated local flora, fauna, and historical elements. In the summer of 1930, his preliminary plans were approved by the board of directors. Sometime later that year, Lyle made an additional trip to New York with partner John Jackson Beck, as well as bank officials and contractors. By Summer 1931, the Great Depression was well underway and the bank slowed down the project. Lyle continued to revise his designs for another year, and in July 1932 provided a set of final drawings to the board. At this point, the project was put on hold.

The board allowed Lyle to continue revising plans for another year. As work had slowed considerably for him, the project allowed his office to remain open. At some point, the bank considered incorporating the Toronto Stock Exchange into its new building, and in summer 1936 the board requested another series of revisions. In summer 1937 the plans were put on hold again, before a smaller building was considered that fall. In 1939, Lyle designed a unique branch for the bank in Saint John.

Had Lyle's design been executed, the project would have been his largest and the crowning achievement of his career.

=== Revisions by Mathers and Haldenby ===
John M. Lyle retired in 1943 and died on 19 December 1945, aged 73. In September 1946, the bank announced that it planned to commence construction on the building after the 15-year delay. To restart the project, the bank hired local firm Mathers and Haldenby. The firm Beck and Eadie, which was formed by Lyle's two partners upon their boss's retirement in 1943, were hired as associates due to their previous work on the project.

Alvan Mathers reviewed Lyle's plans and concluded that the latter's concept was ideal for the project. Mathers revised the plans and removed much of the ornamentation from the original design, creating a far more austere building. The Bank of Montreal Building, which was finished in 1948 and sat directly across Bay Street from the new Bank of Nova Scotia Building, had employed Canadian-themed ornamentation in its design. Thus, Mathers elected to eschew the Canadian decorative programme, and use a Classical mythology theme instead. Exterior sculptures on the building were done by sculptor Frederick Winkler (1898–1974). Mathers did keep some Canadian ornamentation in the interior of the banking hall. In March 1950, the contract for an interior sculpture was given to Jacobine Jones. The artist's bas-relief depicts a logger, miner, welder, farmer, and fisherman, while a banana picker represents the bank's activities in Jamaica. The sculpture was cared with marble from Hauteville, France, and measured 30 feet high when complete.

In the summer of 1947, work began on the project. The first stage was the demolition of the Cawthra House and Canada Life Building. The caption for a photograph of the site shown in the Globe and Mail likened it to London during the Blitz. Through the second half of 1947, work proceeded on excavations and foundations, carried out by J. L. E. Price and Company Limited. In early 1949, a dispute over wages and hours developed between the American Federation of Labor and the Price construction company. On 3 May 1949, workers walked off the site. The bank building was one of many to be involved in the strike, with thousands of men sitting idle. However, from 8–10 May, 20 workers sidestepped the strike to prepare the site for the cornerstone. On 11 May 1949, bank chairman Herbert Deschamps Burns laid the cornerstone. At the ceremony he said, "I wish to thank the unions concerned for making it possible to carry out this ceremony today in spite of the present work stoppage. The co-operation of the individual workmen is equally appreciated." The strike ended on 26 May and construction resumed.

On 17 August 1950 the sidewalk covers around the building were taken down, revealing the structure for the first time. On 5 September, the building's first tenant, Prudential Insurance, moved into its new offices. In June 1951, the bank moved into its offices. The opening ceremony took place on 25 September 1951 with thousands in attendance. at 12:30 pm, official guests met mayor Hiram E. McCallum at City Hall and signed the official guest book. From there, the party paraded down Bay Street in open cars, escorted by mounted and motorcycle police and a highland band. Guests on the platform in front of the building were bank chairman Herbert Burns, bank president Horace L. Enman, bank general manager C. Sydney Frost, bank vice-presidents James Y. Murdoch and F. B. McCurdy, governor of the Bank of Canada Graham F. Towers, Nova Scotia premier Angus L. Macdonald, federal finance minister Douglas Abbott, lieutenant governor of Nova Scotia John Alexander Douglas McCurdy, Ontario premier Leslie Frost, Canadian National Railway president Donald Gordon, and mayor McCallum. Chairman Burns opened the building with a gold key.

During the building's construction, the intersection of King and Bay earned the nickname "MINT Corner," as the four corners were the sites of the Toronto offices of the Bank of Montreal, Imperial Bank of Canada, Bank of Nova Scotia, and Bank of Toronto. MINT Corner remains the epicenter of the Canadian financial industry.

== See also ==
- Bank of Nova Scotia Building, Halifax
