= Canadian Bankers Association =

Canadian trade association

- Association des banquiers canadiens
- Abbreviation: CBA
- Formation: 1891; 135 years ago
- Founded at: Montreal
- Type: Lobby group
- Headquarters: Commerce Court West; 30th floor 199 Bay Street; Toronto
- President and CEO: Anthony G. Ostler
- Website: cba.ca

The Canadian Bankers Association (CBA; French: Association des banquiers canadiens) is a trade association and lobby group representing Canadian banks. Its over 60 members include Canada's Big Five banks, smaller domestic banks, and Canadian subsidiaries of foreign banks.

Founded in Montreal in 1891, the CBA is one of Canada's oldest interest groups. The CBA is headquartered at Commerce Court West in Toronto's Financial District and maintains additional offices in Ottawa and Montreal.

== Lobbying activities with the federal government (2012) ==
According to the Federal lobbyist registry, from January to September 2012, the Canadian Bankers Association had 131 contacts with federal officials to discuss issues such as mortgage insurance, identity theft laws, do-not-call list, corporate income tax, and accounting rules, making it the lobby group with the second most contacts that year.

== Leadership ==
=== President (to 1980) and Chairman of the Executive Council (from 1980) ===
From its inception, the head of the CBA was a president chosen from the ranks of its member banks. The role was voluntary and unpaid, and typically an officeholder would serve two terms. In 1980, the bank hired a full-time, paid president, at which time the former president became Chairman of the Executive Council.

- 1891, 1892 – George Hague
- 1893, 1894 – Sir Byron Edmund Walker
- 1897 – Francis Wolferstan Thomas
- 1899–1909 – Sir Edward Seaborne Clouston
- 1912, 1913, 1914 – Daniel Robert Wilkie
- 1915 – Sir George Burn
- 1916, 1917, 1918 – Edson Loy Pease
- 1919, 1920 – Clarence Atkinson Bogert
- 1921, 1922 – Sir Frederick Williams-Taylor
- 1923, 1924 – Sir John Aird
- 1925, 1926 – Charles Ernest Neill
- 1927, 1928 – Albert Edmund Phipps
- 1929, 1930 – Beaudry Leman
- 1931, 1932 – John Andrew McLeod
- 1933, 1934 – Jackson Dodds
- 1935, 1936 – Sydney Henry Logan
- 1937, 1938 – Sydney George Dobson
- 1939 – Harry Frederick Patterson
- 1940 – Harry Traver Jaffray
- 1941, 1942 – Charles St-Pierre
- 1943, 1944 – Stanley Musgrave Wedd
- 1945, 1946 – Bertie Charles Gardner
- 1947, 1948 – Robert Rae
- 1949, 1950 – Joseph-Ubald Boyer
- 1951, 1952 – Leonard Godfrey Gillett
- 1953, 1954 – Thomas Howard Atkinson
- 1955, 1956 – Frank William Nicks
- 1957, 1958 – Ulric Roberge
- 1959, 1960 – Harold Wilfrid Thomson
- 1961, 1962 – Robert David Mulholland
- 1963, 1964 – William Masterton Currie
- 1964, 1965, 1966 – Samuel Todd Paton
- 1967, 1968 – John Hewson Coleman
- 1969 – Arthur Holmes Crockett
- 1970 – René Leclerc
- 1971, 1972 – Frederick Harold McNeil
- 1973 – Russell Edward Harrison
- 1974, 1975 – John Allan Boyle
- 1976, 1977 – Rowland Cardwell Frazee
- 1978, 1979 – John Alexander Gordon Bell

Title changes to Chairman of the Executive Council on 1 February 1980

- 1980, 1981 – William Elwood Bradford
- 1982, 1983 – Robert Willem Korthals
- 1984, 1985 – Allan Richard Taylor
- 1986, 1987 – André Bérard
- 1988, 1989 – Arthur Warren Moysey
- 1990, 1991 – Peter Cowperthwaite Godsoe
- 1992, 1993 – Francis Anthony Comper
- 1994, 1995 – ?
- 1996, 1997 – William Thomas Brock
- 1998, 1999 – Léon Courville
- 2000 – Michael B. Pedersen
- 2001 – Bruce Robert Birmingham
- 2002, 2003 – Robert William Chisholm
- 2004, 2005, 2006 – Robert William Pearce
- 2007 – Timothy D. Hockey
- 2008 – William James Westlake
- 2009 – Barbara Gayle Stymiest
- 2010, 2011 – Réjean Lévesque
- 2012, 2013 – David Murray Williamson
- 2014, 2015 – Anatol von Hahn
- 2016, 2017 – Cameron McAskile Fowler
- 2018, 2019 – Theresa Lynn Currie
- 2020, 2021 – Neil McLaughlin
- 2022, 2023 – Lucie Blanchet
- 2024, 2025 – Erminia Johannson
- 2026, 2027 – Hratch Dikran Panossian

=== President ===
The office of president, effectively the chief executive of the organisation, was created in June 1980. The first president of the CBA was Robert Mallory MacIntosh, who previously was vice-president of the Bank of Nova Scotia. Upon the creation of the office, the former office of the president became the Chairman of the Executive Council.

1. Robert Mallory MacIntosh, 1 June 1980 – 1 October 1989
2. Helen K. Sinclair, 1 October 1989 – 3 June 1996
3. Raymond Joseph Protti, 3 June 1996 – 28 May 2007
4. Nancy Hughes Anthony, 28 May 2007 – 1 March 2011
5. Terry Campbell, 1 March 2011 – 1 May 2017
6. Neil Parmenter, 1 May 2017 – 23 December 2021
7. Anthony George Ostler, 1 March 2022 – present

== See also ==
- Banking in Canada
