= Bank of Nova Scotia Building =

The Bank of Nova Scotia Building may refer to:

- Bank of Nova Scotia Building, Halifax
- Bank of Nova Scotia Building, Havana
- Bank of Nova Scotia Building, Toronto
