= Canadian Business Hall of Fame =

The Canadian Business Hall of Fame celebrates the outstanding achievements of Canada's most distinguished business leaders, past and present. Over 170 Order of the Business Hall of Fame Companions serve as inspiring examples for all young Canadians and are featured in a display in the Allen Lambert Galleria located at Brookfield Place in Toronto, Ontario. Companions are selected by an independent panel representing Canadian business, academic and media institutions.

The Canadian Business Hall of Fame was established by Junior Achievement of Canada in 1979.

== Companions of the Canadian Business Hall of Fame ==
- Job Abbott
- W. Maxwell "Max" Aitken
- Charles Allard
- Israel H. Asper
- Joseph E. Atkinson
- A. Charles Baillie
- St. Clair Balfour
- Jim Balsillie
- Irving K. Barber
- John W. H. Bassett
- Sonja I. Bata
- Thomas J. Bata
- Laurent Beaudoin
- Adam Beck
- Clive Beddoe
- Michel Bélanger
- Max Bell
- Aldo Bensadoun
- Charles Bentall
- L.L.G. (Poldi) Bentley
- Jim Boucher
- Alfred J. Billes
- J. William Billes
- Henry Birks
- Conrad Black
- J. Armand Bombardier
- Edmund C. Bovey
- John L. Bragg
- Jeffry Hall Brock
- Samuel Bronfman
- Peter M. Brown
- Patrick Burns
- André Chagnon
- John Edward Cleghorn
- John Clyne
- Jack L. Cockwell
- Albert D. Cohen
- George A. Cohon
- Jack Cooper
- Jean Coutu
- George Albertus Cox
- Purdy Crawford
- John Chalker Crosbie
- David M. Culver
- Samuel Cunard
- Richard J. Currie
- Camille A. Dagenais
- Sir Graham Day
- Nan-b de Gaspé Beaubien
- Philippe de Gaspé Beaubien
- A. Jean de Grandpré
- Alphonse Desjardins
- A. Ephraim Diamond
- David Dunkelman
- James Hamet Dunn
- Timothy Eaton
- John Robert Evans
- Anthony S. Fell
- Joseph Flavelle
- Charles Frosst
- Arthur D. Ganong
- Peter E. Gilgan
- Serge Godin
- Peter Godsoe
- George Gooderham
- Donald Gordon
- James K. Gray
- Ian Greenberg
- Frank Griffiths
- Charles L. Gundy
- Richard Haskayne
- Gerald R. Heffernan
- Herbert Samuel Holt
- C.D. Howe
- Arthur Irving
- James K. Irving
- John E. Irving
- K.C. Irving
- Hal Jackman
- Stephen A. Jarislowsky
- Roy Jodrey
- Ron Joyce
- Dr. Norman B. Keevil
- Izaak Walton Killam
- Leon Koerner
- Murray Koffler
- Edouard Lacroix
- Guy Laliberté
- Jacques Lamarre
- Allen T. Lambert
- Mike Lazaridis
- Monique F. Leroux
- Pierre H. Lessard
- Jean-Louis Lévesque
- Theodore Loblaw
- Brandt Louie
- Tong Louie
- John Bayne Maclean
- H.R. MacMillan
- Frederick C. Mannix
- Hart Massey
- Joseph Masson
- John Robert (Bud) McCaig
- Wallace McCain
- Harrison McCain
- Grant McConachie
- Gordon Roy McGregor
- R. S. McLaughlin
- Frank M. McMahon
- William M. Mercer
- David Mirvish
- Ed Mirvish
- John Molson
- Samuel J. Moore
- Peter Munk
- William Neilson
- A. Deane Nesbitt
- Ted Newall
- David P. O'Brien
- Paul Paré
- Jim Pattison
- Edson Loy Pease
- Pierre Péladeau
- Henri Perron
- Jean-Marie Poitras
- Alfred Powis
- David H. Race
- James Armstrong Richardson
- Muriel S. Richardson
- Cedric E. Ritchie
- Edward Samuel "Ted" Rogers
- Jean-Baptiste Rolland
- Stephen Boleslav Roman
- Phillip S. Ross
- John Roth
- Joseph L. Rotman
- Kenneth C. Rowe
- Thomas A. Russell
- Guy Saint-Pierre
- Emanuele (Lino) Saputo
- John M. Schneider
- Seymour Schulich
- Gerald W. Schwartz
- Robert Scrivener
- Joseph Segal
- Joseph Shannon
- Isadore Sharp
- JR Shaw
- Frank H. Sherman
- Clifford Sifton
- George Simpson
- Ian David Sinclair
- Donald A. Smith
- Donald J. Smith
- David F. Sobey
- Donald C.R. Sobey
- Frank H. Sobey
- William Southam
- Ronald D. Southern
- T. A. St-Germain
- Sam Steinberg
- Frank Stronach
- Allan R. Taylor
- E. P. Taylor
- J. Allyn Taylor
- Paul M. Tellier
- Roy H. Thomson
- Ted Tilden
- Walter B. Tilden
- Noah Timmins
- Antoine Turnel
- Joseph Vachon
- William Cornelius Van Horne
- Max Ward
- R. Howard Webster
- W. Galen Weston
- W. Garfield Weston
- L.R. Wilson
- Ray D. Wolfe
- Geoffrey H. Wood
- Charles Woodward
- Stephen J. R. Smith

== See also ==
- 2012 in Canadian business
