= L. Scott Thomson =

Canadian businessman 1970–

- Born: January 1970 (age 55); Vernon, British Columbia
- Education: Queen's University (BA 1992); University of Chicago (MBA 1998)

Lawren Scott Thomson (born January 1970) is a Canadian businessman who since 2022 has been president of the Bank of Nova Scotia. Thomson began his career in 1998 with Goldman Sachs as an investment banker. From 2003 to 2008 he held executive roles with BCE, from 2008 to 2013 was a vice-president of Talisman Energy, and from 2013 to 2022 was president of Finning. On 1 December 2022 Thomson became president of the Bank of Nova Scotia, succeeding Brian J. Porter.

== Early life and education ==
Thomson was born in Vernon, British Columbia in January 1970 to Duane and Carol Thomson. He went to elementary school in Penticton, and graduated from high school at KLO School in Kelowna. After high school he went to Okanagan College for a year, then transferred to Queen's University, where he graduated Bachelor of Arts in economics and political science in 1992. Thomson went next to the University of Chicago, where he received a master of business administration in 1998.

== Career ==
Thomson began his career in 1998 as an investment banker with Goldman Sachs. In 2003 he left Goldman to join BCE in Toronto, where he was appointed vice-president for corporate strategy, mergers and acquisitions. Later he was appointed executive vice-president for corporate development and planning for BCE and Bell Canada Inc. On 2 July 2008, Thomson left BCE and joined Talisman Energy in Calgary as its executive vice-president and chief financial officer. On 17 June 2013, Thomson left Talisman and appointed president of Finning, based in Surrey, British Columbia.

Thomson was elected a director of the Bank of Nova Scotia on 12 April 2016. On 26 September 2022, the bank announced that Thomson would succeed Brian J. Porter as president. Thomson left Finning on 15 November, and began as president of the bank on 1 December. On 1 February 2023, Thomson assumed the additional role of chief executive officer.
