= J. A. Gordon Bell =

Canadian banker (1929–1996)

- Born: 16 August 1929; Rivers, Manitoba, Canada
- Died: 10 March 1996 (aged 66); Toronto, Ontario
- Occupation: Banker
- Known for: President of the Bank of Nova Scotia
- Spouse: Charlene Elizabeth McCabe (m. 1959)
- Children: 2

John Alexander Gordon Bell (16 August 1929 – 10 March 1996) was a Canadian banker who served from 1979 to 1992 as president of the Bank of Nova Scotia.

Bell joined the bank in Toronto in 1948 and worked the next several years in junior roles. Beginning in 1955 he was appointed to a series of managerial positions in England, Canada, and Jamaica. He returned to Toronto in 1968 when he was appointed general manager of the Metropolitan Toronto branches. The following year he was assigned to the head office where he became deputy chief general manager of the bank, and in 1972 he became chief general manager and an executive vice-president.

In 1979, Bell was appointed president and chief operating officer of the bank, succeeding Cedric Elmer Ritchie. Bell retired as president in 1992. He died on 10 March 1996 at age 66.

== Early life ==
John Alexander Gordon Bell was born on 16 August 1929 to the Rev. Dr John Edwin Bell (1898–1958) and Mary McDonald McIlraith (1900–1977). The Bells had four other children: Ian, Donald, Janice, and Mary. John E. Bell was a minister in the United Church of Canada, and the family moved regularly with his postings. At the time of Gordon's birth, his father was posted to Rivers, Manitoba. While Gordon was growing up, John had postings to Brandon, St. John's, St. Catharines, and finally Toronto.

== Career ==
After graduating high school in 1947, Bell joined the Bank of Nova Scotia in Toronto in 1948 at the Queen and Church branch. In 1953 he was assigned to the bank's inspection staff at its general office. In 1955, the bank sent Bell to London, England as a special representative, and in 1957 he was appointed manager of the bank's west end branch in London. He returned to Canada in 1959 where he became assistant manager of the Toronto branch. Subsequently, Bell received a series of branch manager postings, first to Halifax in 1962, then Ottawa in 1964, and Kingston, Jamaica in 1965. In 1966 he became assistant general manager in Kingston, and in 1967 became managing director of the Bank of Nova Scotia Jamaica Limited.

Bell returned to Canada in 1968 and was appointed general manager of the bank's Metropolitan Toronto branches. In 1969 he was appointed deputy chief general manager of the bank, and in 1972 was appointed chief general manager and executive vice-president. At the bank's annual meeting on 12 December 1979, Bell was appointed president and chief operating officer. He succeeded Cedric Elmer Ritchie, who since 1974 also had been chairman. Bell stepped down as president in January 1992 and was succeeded by Peter Cowperthwaite Godsoe. Later that month, he was appointed deputy chief executive officer, acknowledging that he would not pursue the chief executive position at this stage. Bell retired on 31 October 1992 as deputy chairman and deputy chief executive.

== Personal life and death ==
On 10 January 1959, Bell married Charlene Elizabeth McCabe at St Anne's Church, Soho. They had two children, John and Alexandra. Bell was a member of the Toronto Club, York Club, Granite Club, National Club, and Mount Royal Club. He died on 10 March 1996 at age 66.
