= Rick Waugh =

Rick Waugh may refer to:

- Rick Waugh (banker), Canadian banker
- Rick Waugh, Director of King William Department of Social Services and former candidate in 2010 United States House of Representatives elections in Virginia#District 7
