= Brian J. Porter =

Canadian banker 1958–

- Born: 9 February 1958 (age 68); Calgary, Alberta
- Education: Dalhousie University (BCom 1980)
- Occupation: Banker
- Known for: President of the Bank of Nova Scotia 2012-2022
- Spouse: Megan Anne Mustard (m. 1986)
- Children: 3

Brian Johnston Porter (born 9 February 1958) is a Canadian banker who served as the chief executive officer (CEO) of the Bank of Nova Scotia from 2013 to 2022.

== Early life and education ==
Brian Johnston Porter was born on 9 February, 1958, in Calgary, Alberta, to Johnston Donald Porter and Shirley Ann Wight. In 1980, he received a bachelor of commerce from Dalhousie University.

In 1998, he attended the Advanced Management Program at Harvard Business School.

== Career ==
Porter began his career in 1981 with the investment brokerage house McLeod Young Weir, and by 1986 had become a vice-president. In December 1987, McLeod Young Weir was acquired by the Bank of Nova Scotia and renamed ScotiaMcLeod. In 1988, he was elected a director of ScotiaMcLeod and in 1990 became a senior vice-president. In 1996, he became managing director for institutional equities.

From 2005 to 2008, he was the bank's executive vice-president and chief risk officer, from 2008 to 2010 was group head of risk and treasury, and from 2010 to 2012 was group head of international banking.

On 1 November 2012, Porter succeeded Richard Earl Waugh to become the bank's president, and on 1 November 2013 succeeded Waugh as chief executive officer. He held the office until December 2022, when he was succeeded by Lawren Scott Thomson.

In 2023, Porter was appointed as the chair of the Ontario Infrastructure Bank. As of 2025, he also serves as a director of Fairfax Financial Holdings Ltd., chair of the Board of Governors of Huron University College at Western University, and chair of the Atlantic Salmon Federation (Canada). He previously held the position of chair of the University Health Network (UHN) Board of Trustees in Toronto.

== Personal life ==
On 24 May 1986, Porter married Megan Anne Mustard. They have three children.
