= Charles F. W. Burns =

Canadian investment dealer (1907–1982)

- Born: 27 September 1907; Vancouver, British Columbia
- Died: 25 October 1982 (aged 75); Toronto, Ontario
- Education: Upper Canada College; Trinity College School; University of Toronto
- Spouse: Janet Mary Wilson (m. 1934)
- Military career
- Allegiance: Canada
- Branch: Royal Canadian Air Force
- Service years: 1941–1945
- Rank: Squadron Leader
- Conflicts: World War II

Charles Fowler Williams Burns CM (27 September 1907 – 25 October 1982) was a Canadian investment dealer. Burns began his career in 1928 as a junior at the Bank of Nova Scotia where his father, Herbert D. Burns, became president in 1945. He left the bank after a year and moved into the investment business. In January 1932 he founded Chas. Burns & Company, a general brokerage, and in September of that year was joined by his brother Latham, at which time the name was changed to Burns Bros. & Company. The firm became a member of the Toronto Stock Exchange in 1936. Also in 1936, Charles and Latham founded a second investment house, Burns Bros. Limited, which dealt in government and corporate securities. In 1939, Wilfred H. Denton joined the firm, and its name was changed to Burns Bros. & Denton Limited.

Charles served as president of Burns Bros. & Denton from 1936 until 1956, and then as chairman from 1956 until 1976. On 1 March 1976, Burns Bros. & Denton merged with Fry Mills Spence Limited to form Burns Fry Limited. After the merger, he was made honorary chairman of the new firm.

In July 1994, Burns Fry was taken over by Nesbitt, Thomson and Company, which had been a subsidiary of the Bank of Montreal since 1987. The amalgamated firm, BMO Nesbitt Burns, remains one of Canada's largest brokerage houses. Burns served also as an executive in the insurance industry. In 1946, he joined the Crown Life Insurance Company as a director, and in 1948 was appointed a vice-president. He became president in 1959 and was elected chairman in 1964. Burns retired as chairman in 1979. He died in Toronto on 25 October 1982 at age 75.

== Early life and education ==
Charles Fowler Williams Burns was born in Vancouver on 27 September 1907 to Herbert Deschamps Burns (1878–1960) and Marguerite Williams (1883–1947). Herbert, of Maritime origin, worked for the Bank of Nova Scotia, and in 1906 had been appointed manager of the bank's Vancouver branch.

Charles had an older brother, Herbert Latham (1906–1936), and two younger siblings, John Harrison (1908–1935), and Constance Isobel (1913–1983). In 1915, his father was appointed a superintendent with the bank, and the family relocated to Toronto. Herbert became president of the bank in 1945, and chairman in 1949.

Charles attended Upper Canada College from 1916 to 1921, and Trinity College School from 1921 to 1926. At Trinity, he was captain of the football, hockey, and cricket teams. After high school, Burns attended the University of Toronto for two years. While at university, he was a member of Zeta Psi. He was a member of the university's football team, and did not graduate.

== Career ==
After leaving university in 1928, Burns joined his father's bank in the call loan department. He worked for a bank for a year, and in then in 1929 joined Campbell Stratton as a floor trader at the Toronto Stock Exchange. He remained there until 1931, when he joined R. A. Daly & Co. as an investment dealer. In January 1932, Burns borrowed $500 from his father to start the stock brokerage Chas. Burns & Company. In September of that year Charles was joined by his brother H. Latham Burns, and the firm changed its name to Burns Bros. & Company. In February 1936, Burns borrowed $50,000 from his mother-in-law to purchase a seat on the Toronto Stock Exchange. In February 1936, Charles and Latham founded a second investment house, Burns Bros. Limited. This firm would deal in corporate and government securities. Latham would be president, while Charles would be vice-president. However, on 7 April of that year, Latham died in Bermuda while on an Easter vacation. After his death, Charles assumed the presidency. In 1939, Wilfred Herbert Denton (1896–1948) joined the firm as vice-president, and at this time the name changed to Burns Bros. & Denton Limited.

On 1 August 1941, a month short of turning 34, Burns joined the Royal Canadian Air Force. Burns spent a year in England, before being assigned to RCAF Eastern Air Command in the Maritimes. He was tasked with organising the Command's flight control, which involved locating and rescuing downed crews and directing damaged aircraft to safety. He left the air force at the end of hostilities with the rank of Squadron Leader.

After the war, Burns returned to his investment business. In 1956, Burns ceded the presidency of Burns Bros. & Denton to D. S. Beatty, and at that time became chairman of the board. Beatty remained president until 1966, when Latham Cawthra Burns (1930–2015), H. Latham's son, assumed the post. On 1 March 1976, Burns Bros. & Denton merged with Fry Mills Spence Limited to form Burns Fry Limited. After the merger, Latham Burns became chairman of the new firm, while Charles became honorary chairman. The presidency was given to Jack Lawrence, who had been president of Fry Mills Spence. In late 1986, the federal government amended the Bank Act to allows banks to purchase investment brokerages outright. Accordingly, in the summer of 1987, the Bank of Montreal acquired Nesbitt, Thomson and Company, which became a subsidiary. In July 1994, Nesbitt Thomson announced its intention to acquire Burns Fry. The deal closed on 1 September, and BMO Nesbitt Burns came into existence. The firm remains one of the country's largest brokerages.

Besides his work in the investment world, Burns spent much of his career with the Crown Life Insurance Company, where his father had been chairman of the board. His relationship with the company began in 1946 when he was elected a director. Two years later, he was appointed a vice-president. Effective 1 February 1959, Burns was appointed president of Crown Life. He succeeded H. R. Stephenson, who became chairman of the board. He remained president until February 1964, when he was succeeded by A. F. Williams, and was elected chairman. Burns held the chair until 8 March 1979, when he was succeeded by his son Michael. After stepping down as chairman, Charles remained a director and was elected honorary chairman.

Burns held directorates with Canadian Breweries, the Algoma Central Railway, Telegram Publishing Company, Chartered Trust, Monarch Knitting, Maple Leaf Gardens, General Accident Assurance, Wool Combing Corporation, Scottish Canadian Assurance Corporation, Jockey Club of Toronto, Toronto Argonaut Football Club, Denison Mines, Harry E. Foster Agencies, Gridoil Freehold Leases, Rothmans of Pall Mall Canada, Baton Broadcasting, United Steel, Huron Forest Products, Devon Dairy, Investment Management Corporation, and the Royal Agricultural Winter Fair. In 1957, he served as president of the Royal Agricultural Winter Fair. He was a member of the Toronto Club, York Club, University Club of Toronto, Toronto Hunt Club, Halifax Club, Anglican Church of Canada, and Freemasons. On 17 December 1979, Burns was awarded the Order of Canada, and was invested on 16 April 1980. In 1991, he was inducted posthumously into the Canadian Horse Racing Hall of Fame. He was a life governor of Trinity College School, and served for 18 years as a governor of the University of Toronto.

== Personal life ==
On 23 February 1934 at St. Andrew's Presbyterian Church in Ottawa, Burns married Janet Mary Wilson (1911–1999). Janet was the daughter of Norman Frank Wilson and Cairine Wilson. They had three children: Herbert Michael (1937–2023), Joan Harrison, and Janet Mary "Din" Cairine (1940–1983). Michael worked for Burns Bros. and became chairman of Crown Life upon Charles's retirement in 1979. Joan was married to car dealer and politician John Hollings Addison, and Din was married to Olympic equestrian Jim Day.

After the war, Charles built Kingfield Farms near King City, Ontario, where he began breeding Guernsey cattle and later opened a racing stable. The Burns family remains a prominent member of Canada's horse racing community, and Kingfield is now run by Din and Jim Day's daughter, Catherine Day Phillips.

Burns died in Toronto on 25 October 1982 at age 75. The funeral was held at All Saints' Anglican Church in King City on Friday, 29 October. He was interred in King City Cemetery.
