= DundeeWealth =

DundeeWealth Inc.
- Company type: Public
- Industry: Financial Services
- Founded: 1998
- Defunct: 2013
- Fate: Acquired by Scotiabank
- Successor: HollisWealth
- Headquarters: Toronto, Ontario, Canada
- Revenue: $895 million CAD (2006)
- Total assets: $62.7 billion CAD (2007)
- Number of employees: 1,000
- Parent: Dundee Corporation
- Website: www.dundeewealth.com

DundeeWealth Inc. was a Canadian financial services company, formerly a public company and subsidiary of Dundee Corporation.

DundeeWealth Inc. and its advisor network were acquired by Scotiabank on February 1, 2011. DundeeWealth Inc. has been renamed HollisWealth Inc. and effective November 1, 2013, HollisWealth replaced DundeeWealth as the brand name used by Scotiabank to identify one of Canada's largest independent financial advisor networks. The name HollisWealth is derived from the location of Scotiabank's historic head office building which was constructed more than 175 years ago, in 1837, at 188 Hollis Street in Halifax, Nova Scotia. In 2017, iA Financial Group acquired HollisWealth from Scotiabank and merged its Investment Industry Regulatory Organization of Canada-regulated arm with iA Securities and its Mutual Fund Dealers Association of Canada-regulated arm with Investia Financial Services Inc. Post-merger, HollisWealth advisor teams continued to use the HollisWealth brand.

== Subsidiaries ==
- Brokerage
  - DWM Securities Inc.
  - Dundee Private Investors Inc.
  - Dundee Insurance Agency Ltd.
  - Dundee Mortgage Services Inc.
- Investment Management
  - GCIC Ltd.
  - Dynamic Funds
  - DundeeWealth Investment Counsel (formerly Goodman Private Wealth Management)

=== Brokerage ===
DundeeWealth's brokerage business was made up of DWM Securities Inc., Dundee Private Investors Inc., Dundee Insurance Agency Ltd., and Dundee Mortgages Services Inc.

These operations included a full service investment dealer engaged in wealth management & financial advisory services, retail brokerage, financial planning, mutual fund dealership, a full service Managing General Agency (Insurance), and Mortgage services.

=== Investment management ===
DundeeWealth's investment management business was run by GCIC Ltd., whose Dynamic Funds division is perhaps the more commonly known business in DundeeWealth's investment management business.

Dynamic Funds is a mutual fund company, competing with the likes of Fidelity, Invesco Trimark, AIC, CI Funds, and many others. See the mutual fund companies in Canada page for more information.
