= Bank of Nova Scotia Building, Halifax =

Building in Halifax, Nova Scotia

Bank of Nova Scotia Building
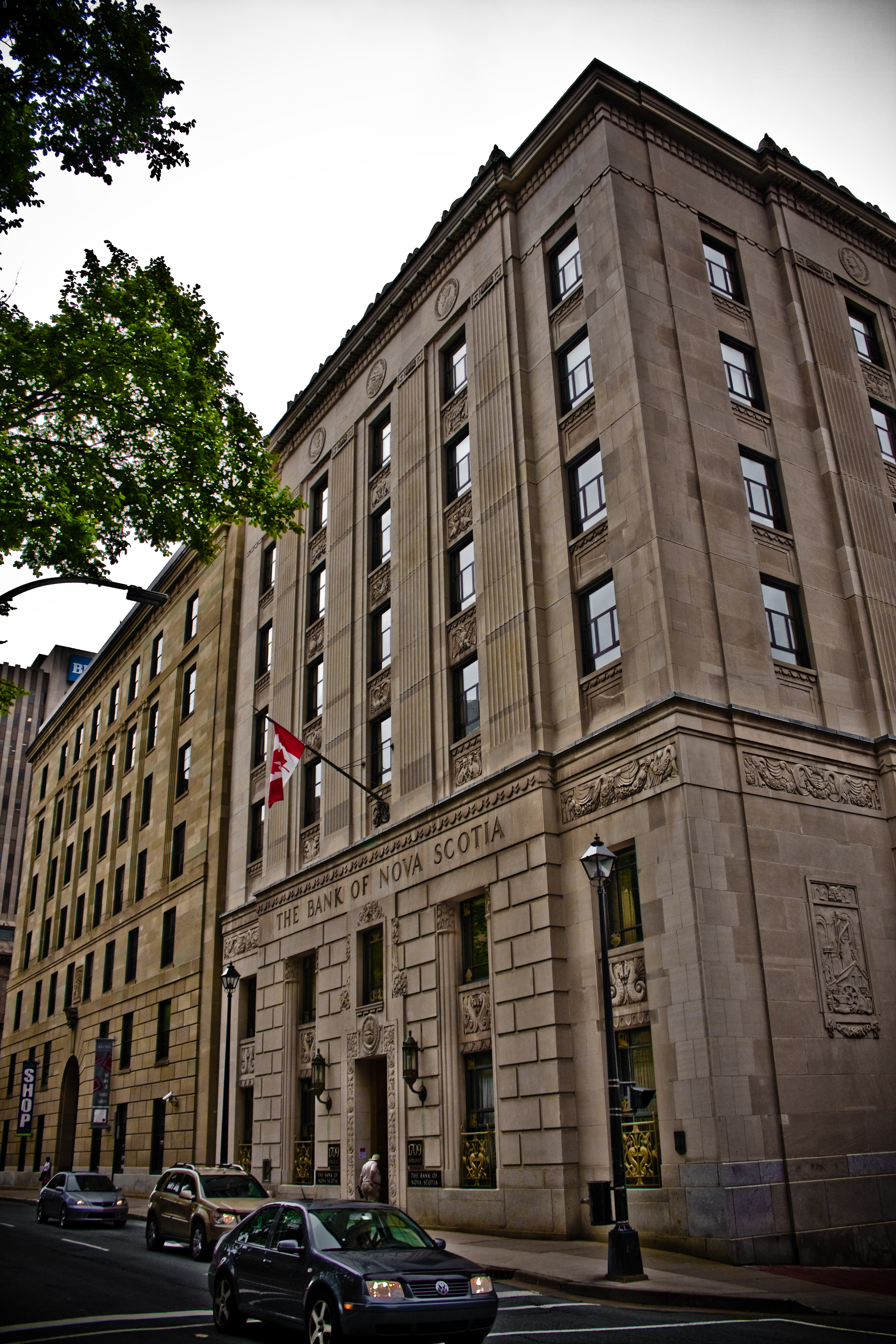
- The Bank of Nova Scotia Building in 2010
- Interactive map of the Bank of Nova Scotia Building area

General information
- Architectural style: Beaux-Arts architecture
- Location: 1709 Hollis Street, Halifax, Nova Scotia
- Coordinates: 44.647796°N 63.572583°W
- Year built: 1930
- Owner: Bank of Nova Scotia

Technical details
- Material: Sandstone
- Floor count: 6

Design and construction
- Architect: John M. Lyle

The Bank of Nova Scotia Building is a six-storey sandstone building located in Downtown Halifax, Nova Scotia, adjacent from Province House on Hollis Street. Erected in 1930, the building was designed by the Canadian architect John M. Lyle in the Beaux-Arts style with classical features. It was one of three banks commissioned from Lyle by the Bank of Nova Scotia which he began designing in 1907. The building is six storeys high, adorned with stone carvings of wildlife, flowers, and other symbols.

The bank's large front doors are constructed of carved bronze. Inside the bank, the floor of the main area is sheathed in marble, brass, bronze, and wood; the entrance floor is adorned with a large circular coat of arms made of metal.

== See also ==
- Bank of Nova Scotia Building, Toronto
- List of historic places in Halifax, Nova Scotia
