= John Doull (banker) =

Nova Scotian banker

John Doull (3 March 1823 - 14 September 1899) was a businessman who as a boy immigrated with his family from Scotland to Nova Scotia and rose to become the President of the Bank of Nova Scotia.

He was born in Wick, in Caithness, in 1823 and immigrated to Nova Scotia at the age of twelve. When he was twenty he became a resident of Halifax, where he spent the remainder of his life. Like other members of his family he was a member of and closely associated with the North British Society. He was the President of the Bank of Nova Scotia early in the 1870s and then again for about a decade at the end of his life. He was married twice, first to Elizabeth Blackie and subsequently to Mary Jane Ives. He died in Halifax in 1899.
