= William M. Currie =

Canadian banker (1910–1980)

- Born: 22 May 1910; Medicine Hat, Alberta, Canada
- Died: 18 December 1980 (aged 70); Vancouver, British Columbia
- Spouse: Audrey Margaret Echlin (m. 1956)
- Military career
- Allegiance: United Kingdom
- Branch: Trinidad Royal Naval Volunteer Reserve
- Service years: 1943–1946
- Conflicts: World War II

William Masterton Currie (22 May 1910 – 18 December 1980) was a Canadian banker who served from 1964 to 1968 as president of the Canadian Imperial Bank of Commerce.

Currie began his career in 1927 with the Canadian Bank of Commerce. During the 1930s he was posted to the bank's branch in Trinidad, and from 1943 to 1946 he served as an officer in the Trinidad Royal Naval Volunteer Reserve. Following the war, Currie had postings in London, England and Kingston, Jamaica before being transferred to the head office in Toronto in 1954.

By 1959 he was a deputy general manager of the bank, and when the new Canadian Imperial Bank of Commerce was created in 1961, he retained the same title with the new bank. In December 1964, Currie succeeded Jeffery Page Rein Wadsworth as president. He remained president until 1968, when he was appointed vice-chairman and relocated to Vancouver. Currie retired from the bank in 1973 and died in Vancouver in 1980 at age 70.

== Early years and education ==
William Masterton Currie was born on 22 May 1910 in Medicine Hat, Alberta to William Masterton Currie Sr (1884–1959) and Mary Anne Murdoch (1882–1980).

== Career ==
Currie began his employment with the Canadian Bank of Commerce on 4 July 1927 in his home town. At some point in the 1930s, he was assigned to the bank's branch in Port of Spain, Trinidad.

During World War II, Currie left his employ with the bank and joined the Trinidad Royal Naval Volunteer Reserve. He served as a naval officer from April 1943 to July 1946. When he returned to the bank in 1946 he was appointed to the London, England branch, then came back to the Caribbean in 1950 where he was appointed assistant manager of the Kingston, Jamaica branch.

In 1954, Currie moved to Toronto where he was appointed manager of the bank's mortgage department at the head office. The following year he was appointed chief inspector of the bank. In 1956 he was made regional superintendent in Winnipeg, in November 1957 became assistant general manager in Winnipeg, and in May 1959 assistant general manager for Ontario. In December 1959, he returned to the head office in Toronto and was appointed deputy general manager of the bank. When the Canadian Bank of Commerce merged with the Imperial Bank of Canada on 1 June 1961 to form the Canadian Imperial Bank of Commerce, Currie was made deputy general manager of the new bank. On 23 May 1963, he was appointed chief general manager, and on 21 May 1964 was elected a director.

On 8 December 1964, Currie succeeded Jeffery Page Rein Wadsworth to become the bank's third president. He remained president until 4 April 1968, when he was appointed vice-chairman. Upon this appointment, he left Toronto and relocated to the bank's Vancouver office. In Vancouver, the Curries lived at 1438 Minto Crescent in Shaughnessy. He retired from the bank on 22 May 1973.

== Other interests ==
Currie was a member of the Toronto Club, York Club, Toronto Golf Club, Granite Club, Mount Royal Club, Shaughnessy Golf & Country Club, and Vancouver Club. He served as a director of the General Accident Assurance Company, Scottish Canadian Assurance Corporation, Canadian Nuclear Association, and Canadian Pioneer Insurance Company. Currie served from July 1963 to December 1964 as president of the Canadian Bankers' Association, and was chairman of the 1962 United Appeal for Metropolitan Toronto.

== Personal life ==
On 7 April 1956, Currie married Audrey Margaret Echlin (1929–2007). They had four children: Catherine, William, Elizabeth, and James. Currie died on 18 December 1980 in Vancouver at age 70.
