= Herbert D. Burns =

Canadian banker (1878–1960)

- Born: 11 June 1878; Digby, Nova Scotia
- Died: 28 March 1960 (aged 81); Toronto, Ontario
- Occupation: Banker
- Spouses: Marguerite Williams (m. 1903; died 1947); Aileen Steele Burns
- Children: 4

Herbert Deschamps Burns (11 June 1878 – 28 March 1960) was a Canadian banker who served from 1945 to 1949 as president and from 1949 to 1955 as chairman of the Bank of Nova Scotia.

Burns joined the bank in Moncton, New Brunswick in 1896 as a junior clerk. Beginning in 1905 he was appointed to a series of managerial roles, before joining the head office in Toronto in 1923 as assistant general manager. Burns became general manager in 1941 and in 1945 was appointed a vice-president. In October 1945, he assumed the presidency. He held the post until 1949, when he became chairman of the board. Burns retired as chairman in 1955.

In 1932, two of Burns's sons founded the investment brokerage Burns Bros. & Company. In 1994 it was acquired by the Bank of Montreal and merged with Nesbitt, Thomson and Company to form BMO Nesbitt Burns, which continues as one of Canada's largest brokerages. Burns died in Toronto on 28 March 1960 at age 81.

== Early years and education ==
Herbert Deschamps Burns was born in Digby, Nova Scotia on 11 June 1878 to Charles Fowler Burns (1854–1918) and Sarah Caroline Brown (1854–1937). He was educated at Digby Academy, and graduated high school in Moncton, New Brunswick. Burns was descended from United Empire Loyalists.

== Career ==
Burns joined the Bank of Nova Scotia in Moncton as a junior clerk on 18 April 1896. From 1901 to 1903 he served as an accountant at the bank's Boston branch, and then from 1903 to 1905 as an accountant at its Montreal branch. He then held managerial posts at the banks branches in Kentville, Nova Scotia (1905–6), Woodstock, New Brunswick (1906), and Vancouver (1906–15). In 1915 he moved to Toronto, where he became superintendent of the bank's western branches, and then from 1916 to 1923 was appointed manager of the Toronto branch. In 1923 he became assistant general manager of the bank, in 1941 was appointed general manager, in 1944 was elected a director, and in 1945 was made a vice-president. In October 1945, Burns was appointed president, succeeding John Andrew McLeod. He held the post until 1949, when he was succeeded by Horace Luttrell Enman. When he stepped down as president, he succeeded McLeod as chairman of the board. He remained chairman until he was replaced in 1955 by Enman.

In addition to his work with the bank, Burns served as president and chairman of the Crown Life Insurance Company. He was a director of the National Trust Company, Central Canada Loan & Savings Co., and the Toronto Savings & Loan Co.

== Personal life ==
On 10 November 1903, Burns married Marguerite Williams (1883–1947). They had four children: Herbert Latham (1906–1936), Charles Fowler Williams (1906–1982), John Harrison (1908–1935), and Constance Isobel (1913–1983).

In 1932, two of his sons Latham and Charles founded Burns Bros. & Company, an investment brokerage. Burns Bros., which became Burns Fry in later years, was acquired in 1994 by the Bank of Montreal, and is now part of BMO Nesbitt Burns. Latham married Isobel Cawtha of the Cawthra family. They had a son, Latham Cawtha Burns (1930–2015), who was later president of Burns Bros.

The family was struck with tragedy when John Burns was killed in a car crash in 1935, and then Latham Burns died of pneumonia the following year. Constance Burns married Bruce Grant Eaton, a descendant of Benjamin Harrison Eaton. After his wife's death in 1947, Herbert remarried to Aileen Steele (1902–1994).

Burns died at his Rosedale home in Toronto on 28 March 1960 at age 81.
