= Cedric Ritchie =

Canadian banker (1927–2016)

- Born: 22 August 1927; Upper Kent, New Brunswick
- Died: 20 March 2016 (aged 88); Toronto, Ontario
- Spouse: Barbara Binnington (m. 1956)

Cedric Elmer Ritchie OC (22 August 1927 – 20 March 2016) was a Canadian businessman and chairman and CEO of The Bank of Nova Scotia. He was also chairman of the Business Development Bank of Canada since 2001.

== Career ==
At age 17, Ritchie, the son of a potato farmer, began working as a teller in The Bank of Nova Scotia's Bath, New Brunswick branch. In 1958, he became assistant branch manager in Toronto and chief general manager in 1970.

== Honours ==
In 1981, he was made an Officer of the Order of Canada in recognition of "his wide knowledge of banking and commerce". He was inducted into the Canadian Business Hall of Fame in 2000.

== Election to board of directors ==
In 2003, he was appointed to the Board of Directors of Twin Mining Corporation. He is also a member of the Board of Director of Canada Post.

== Honorary degrees ==
- LL.D., St. Francis Xavier University, December 1979
- LL.D., Dalhousie University, May 1983
- LL.D., Queen's University, June 1984
- LL.D., University of New Brunswick, October 1985
- LL.D., Mount Allison University, October 1986

== Awards ==
- Sikatuna Award, Philippines
