= C. Sydney Frost =

Canadian banker (1893–1985)

C. Sydney Frost MC
- Born: 27 November 1893; Argyle, Nova Scotia
- Died: 15 April 1985 (aged 91); Toronto, Ontario
- Education: Yarmouth Academy
- Spouse: Gertrude Rebecca Hains (m. 1921)
- Children: 3
- Military career
- Allegiance: Canada
- Branch: Canadian Army
- Service years: 1914–1919
- Rank: Captain
- Unit: Royal Newfoundland Regiment
- Conflicts: World War I

Charles Sydney Frost MC (27 November 1893 – 15 April 1985) was a Canadian banker who served from 1956 to 1958 as president of the Bank of Nova Scotia.

Frost joined the bank in 1908 in Yarmouth, and worked there until 1914, when he was posted to St. John's, Newfoundland as an accountant. Upon the outbreak of World War I, Frost joined the Royal Newfoundland Regiment and went on to serve in France. After the war, Frost rejoined the bank in Newfoundland as a manager.

Over the succeeding decades, Frost was appointed to a series of managerial and supervisory posts across the country. In 1946 he joined the head office in Toronto, where he became assistant general manager. In 1949 he became general manager, in 1950 was elected a director, in 1951 was appointed a vice-president, and in 1954 was appointed an executive vice-president. In June 1956, Frost was made president of the bank. He held this post until his retirement in December 1958. Frost died in Toronto on 15 April 1985.

== Early life ==
Charles Sydney frost was born in Argyle, Nova Scotia on 27 November 1893 to Albert Wallace Frost (1854–1898) and Alice Maud Baker (1863–1951). He was educated in Yarmouth at Yarmouth Academy.

== Career ==
In 1908, Frost joined the Bank of Nova Scotia in Yarmouth as a junior clerk. He continued in the position until 1914, when he was transferred by the bank to St. John's, Newfoundland to work as an accountant. After the outbreak of war, on 24 August 1914 Frost enlisted in the Royal Newfoundland Regiment. He went on to serve with distinction in France. He was wounded in the Battle of Le Transloy on 12 October 1916, and on 28 September 1918 received the Military Cross. Frost was decommissioned on 2 June 1919.

Upon returning to Newfoundland in 1919, Frost rejoined the bank in Fogo, where he was made branch manager. In 1921 he transferred back to St. John's, where he became the assistant manager. He became assistant manager in Winnipeg in 1926, and then was made manager in Saskatoon in 1931 and Saint John in 1938. From 1941 to 1946 he was a supervisor in Toronto and Saint John. In 1946, Frost was assigned to the bank's head office in Toronto where he became assistant general manager, and then in 1949 became general manager. He was elected a director in 1950. In 1951 the bank made him a vice-president, and in 1954 an executive vice-president. In June 1956, Frost was appointed president, succeeding Horace Luttrell Enman. He held the post until December 1958, when he stepped down and was replaced by F. William Nicks.

== Personal life and recognition ==
On 1 July 1921, Frost married Gertrude Rebecca Hains (1895–1982). They had three children, Charles Sydney Jr. (1922–2009), Robert Judson (1927–2012), and Vyvyan Elaine (1934–2011). Frost died in Toronto on 15 April 1985. He was interred at Mount Pleasant Cemetery.

In 1958, Victoria Park in Yarmouth was renamed Frost Park in his honour.

== Works ==
Frost, C. Sydney. A Blue Puttee at War: The Memoir of Captain Sydney Frost, MC. Flanker Press, 2014.
