= Arthur Holmes Crockett =

Canadian banker (1917–1992)

- Born: 12 January 1917; Westville, Nova Scotia
- Died: 18 September 2009 (aged 92); Toronto, Ontario
- Spouse: Margaret Louise Macdonald (m. 1951)
- Military career
- Allegiance: Canada
- Branch: Royal Canadian Navy
- Service years: 1941–1945
- Rank: Lieutenant Commander
- Conflicts: World War II

Arthur Holmes Crockett (12 January 1917 – 18 September 2009) was a Canadian banker who served from 1970 to 1972 as president of the Bank of Nova Scotia.
