= Finning =

Canadian Caterpillar dealer

- Type: Public (TSX: FTT)
- Industry: Industrial Equipment Wholesale
- Founded: Vancouver, British Columbia (1933)
- Headquarters: Edmonton, Alberta
- Area served: Argentina; Bolivia; Canada (British Columbia, Alberta, Saskatchewan, Yukon, Northwest Territories); Chile; Ireland; United Kingdom
- Key people: Kevin Parkes, President & CEO
- Products: Industrial products distribution & support services
- Revenue: ▲$11.13 billion CAN (2024)
- Number of employees: 13,975 (2023)
- Website: finning.com

Finning is a Canadian industrial equipment dealer specializing in Caterpillar products. It is responsible for selling, renting and providing parts and service for equipment and engines to customers in industries including mining, construction, petroleum, forestry and a wide range of power systems applications. According to the company, it is the largest Caterpillar dealer in the world.

Finning employs more than 13,000 people worldwide and operates in three geographies (Western Canada, South America, and UK and Ireland), with its head office in Edmonton, Alberta, Canada.

In Western Canada, Finning provides product support services across British Columbia, Yukon, Alberta, Saskatchewan, the Northwest Territories, and a portion of Nunavut.

Finning (FINSA) in South America, Finning’s regional head office is located in Santiago, Chile, and product support services are provided across Chile, Argentina and Bolivia.

Finning (FINUKI) in the United Kingdom and Ireland, Finning’s regional head office is in Cannock, UK, and product support services are provided across the two countries.

== History ==
Earl B. Finning started the Finning business in 1933 in western Canada. The business expanded, and by 1965, the company had more than one thousand employees and annual revenues of up to $78 million. In 1969, Finning went public, with its common shares trading on the Vancouver and Toronto stock exchanges under the symbol FTT. Finning remains one of only a handful of publicly traded Caterpillar dealers. In 1983, Finning acquired the right to represent Caterpillar in western England, Wales and Scotland. Then in 1989, Finning expanded into Alberta and the Northwest Territories.

By 2003, Finning was operating as the sole dealer of Caterpillar equipment in England, Scotland, Wales, as well as in Chile, Argentina and Bolivia. In 2004, Finning invested in OEM Remanufacturing, a component rebuild facility in Edmonton, Alberta. Finning was appointed dealer in Northern Ireland and the Republic of Ireland in 2010. In 2015 Finning expanded to Saskatchewan, acquiring Regina based Kramer Caterpillar for $230 million CAD.

Today, Finning operates in six countries, with annual revenues of $6.2 billion (2017), and is the largest Caterpillar dealer in the world.
