= Samuel J. Moore =

Canadian businessman

- Born: 3 August 1859; Great Doddington, Northamptonshire
- Died: 23 April 1948 (aged 88); Toronto, Ontario
- Spouse: Matilda Anne Lang (m. 1878)

Samuel John Moore (3 August 1859 – 23 April 1948) was a British-Canadian businessman, founder of Moore Corporation Limited.

== Biography ==
Samuel J. Moore was born in Great Doddington, England on August 3, 1859, and came with his family to Barrie, Ontario while still young. When he was 12, he found work at the Barrie Examiner as a printer's assistant, later becoming local editor. He worked in Texas, then returned to found Grip, a satirical weekly journal, with J. W. Bengough.

He married Matilda Anne Lang in August 1878, and they had four children.

In 1882, Moore left to found Moore Business Forms (then called Grip Printing & Publishing Company), which sold books of sales slips with flip-over carbon paper. The company, later Moore Corporation Limited, went on to become a major supplier of business forms and printing services in North America. Other affiliated companies were formed in the United Kingdom and Australia. Moore also founded the Metropolitan Bank of Canada in 1902; it was merged with Scotiabank, where Moore served as president and chairman of the board.

He died in Toronto on April 23, 1948.

== Charitable work ==
Moore played an important role in the development of the YMCA in Canada and was a major supporter of the Canadian Baptist Church being a member of Dovercourt Road Baptist Church in Toronto and Sunday school leader. He was one of the founders of Toronto Bible Training School, established in 1894 (in 1912 the name was changed to Toronto Bible College) with Elmore Harris another Toronto Baptist Pastor and others. Among his YMCA activities was supporting the construction of the Dovercourt YMCA Building in Toronto.

Moore Corporation Limited merged with Wallace Computer Services in 2003 to form MooreWallace, which was subsequently acquired by R. R. Donnelley & Sons Company.
