= John Andrew McLeod =

Canadian banker (1868–1946)

- Born: 8 August 1868; Park Corner, Prince Edward Island
- Died: 5 March 1946 (aged 77); Victoria, British Columbia
- Spouse: Cecilia Caldwell (m. 1897)

John Andrew McLeod (8 August 1868 – 5 March 1946) was a Canadian banker who served from 1934 to 1945 as president and from 1945 to 1946 as chairman of the Bank of Nova Scotia.
