= Richard E. Waugh =

Canadian banking executive (born 1947)

- Born: 23 December 1947 (age 78); Winnipeg, Manitoba
- Education: University of Manitoba (BCom 1970); York University (MBA 1974)
- Spouse: Lynne April (m. 1974)

Richard Earl Waugh (born 23 December 1947) is a Canadian banking executive. Born in Winnipeg, Manitoba, he is the Deputy Chairman of Scotiabank, and an Officer of the Order of Canada. He was the chief executive officer of Scotiabank, between 2004 and 2013.

== Career ==
In 2007, he was appointed by government officials to offer his views at summit talks regarding business prospects in Latin America. Waugh publicly advocated for more transparent rules regarding foreign takeovers of Canadian businesses in 2010. Waugh was cited as having the highest CEO pay increase of 29% in 2009 during the Great Recession. He earned C$9.7 million in 2009, including salary, bonus, and equity-linked compensation, according to Bloomberg News. During his tenure the bank experienced growth, in addition to the impact of fraud allegations during its efforts at international expansion. According to the Globe and Mail, Waugh was considered successful at increasing his bank's profit margin, however, "He has been dubbed a micro-manager who put a lot of pressure on his top lieutenants, with one source describing his management style as "bad parenting". He retired in 2013. Waugh later became the chair of the York University Board of Governors. In 2018, several of the faculties and students associations at York issued votes of non-confidence in his leadership during a lengthy teachers strike.

== Education ==
He obtained his undergraduate degree from the University of Manitoba. He holds an MBA and an Honorary Doctor of Laws degree from York University's Schulich School of Business.
