= Scotiabank =

Canadian multinational bank headquartered in Toronto

Bank of Nova Scotia

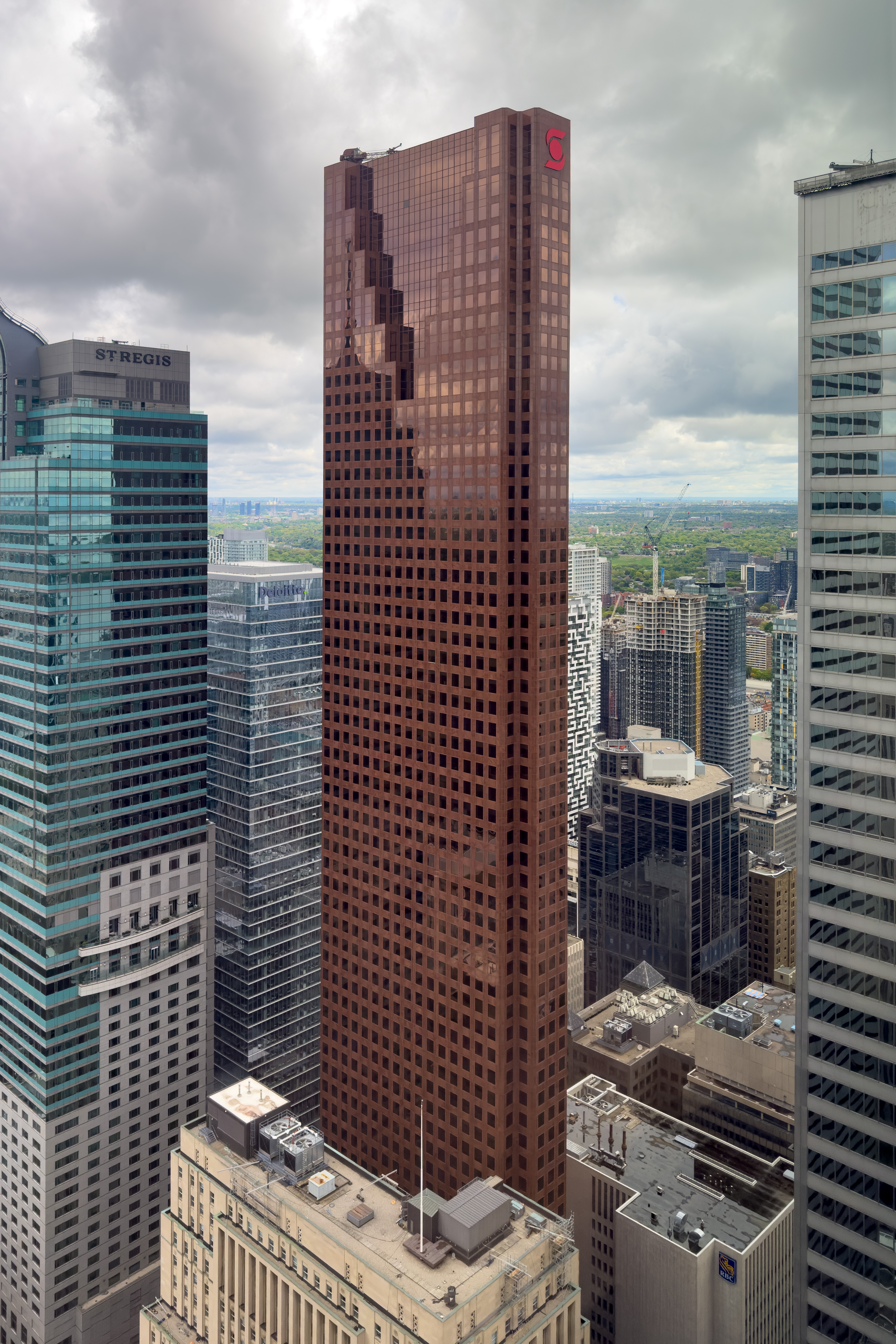
- Scotia Plaza in Toronto
- Trade name: Scotiabank
- Type: Public
- Traded as: TSX: BNS; NYSE: BNS; S&P/TSX 60 component
- ISIN: CA0641491075
- Industry: Banking; financial services
- Founded: March 30, 1832; 194 years ago Halifax, Nova Scotia
- Headquarters: Scotiabank North Tower; 40 Temperance Street; Toronto, Ontario, Canada
- Key people: L. Scott Thomson (president and CEO); Raj Viswanathan (CFO)
- Products: Asset management; Banking; Commodities; Credit cards; Equities trading; Insurance; Investment management; Mortgage loans; Private equity; Wealth management
- Revenue: ▲CA$37.74 billion (2025)
- Net income: ▼CA$7.76 billion (2025)
- AUM: ▲CA$432.38 billion (2025)
- Total assets: ▲CA$1.460 trillion (2025)
- Total equity: ▲CA$88.59 billion (2025)
- Number of employees: 86,431 (2025)
- Subsidiaries: Tangerine Bank
- Website: www.scotiabank.com

Banque Scotia logo, used for francophone Scotiabank customers in Canada

The Bank of Nova Scotia (French: Banque de Nouvelle-Écosse), operating as Scotiabank (French: Banque Scotia), is a Canadian multinational banking and financial services company headquartered in Toronto, Ontario. One of Canada's Big Five banks, it is the third-largest Canadian bank by assets and deposits. In 2023, the company's seat in Forbes Global 2000 was 88. Scotiabank serves over 25 million customers globally, offering personal and commercial banking, wealth management, corporate and investment services. With 88,000 employees and assets of approximately $1.5 trillion as of January 31, 2026, Scotiabank trades on the Toronto and New York stock exchanges under the symbol BNS. Scotiabank's institution number is 002, and the SWIFT code is NOSCCATT.

Scotiabank was founded in 1832 in Halifax, Nova Scotia, where it was headquartered until relocating to Toronto in 1900. Scotiabank has billed itself as "Canada's most international bank" due to its acquisitions primarily in Latin America and the Caribbean, and also in Europe and parts of Asia. Scotiabank is a member of the London Bullion Market Association and one of fifteen accredited institutions which participate in the London gold fixing. From 1997 to 2019, this was conducted through its precious metals division ScotiaMocatta.

Scotiabank's president and CEO Brian J. Porter announced his retirement to be effective January 31, 2023, and Scott Thompson was named as his replacement.

== History ==
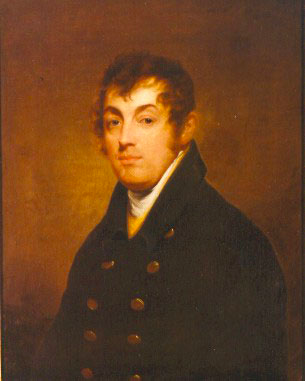
William Lawson served as the first president of the Bank of Nova Scotia, from 1832 to 1837.

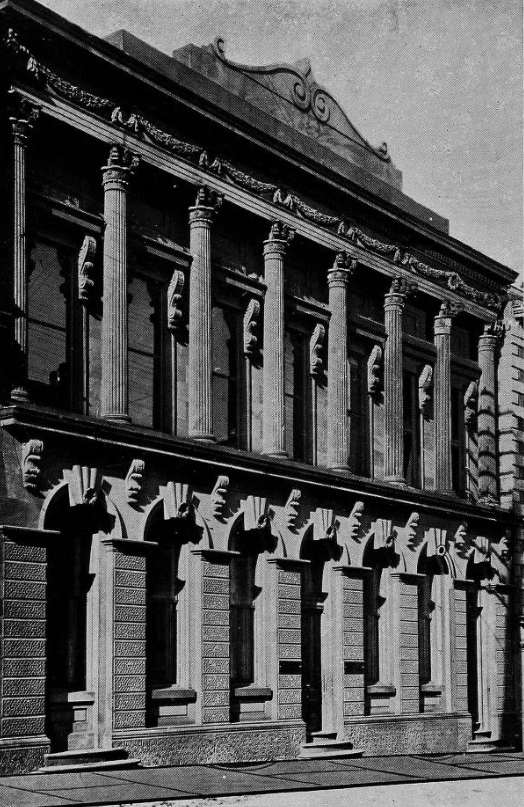
The bank constructed its first building of its own on Hollis Street in Halifax in 1837.

=== 1832–1900: Founding and early development ===
The Bank of Nova Scotia was founded in 1832 in Halifax, Nova Scotia, a British colony at that time. The bank was incorporated by the Legislative Assembly of Nova Scotia on March 30, 1832. William Lawson was the first president. The bank intended to facilitate the trans-Atlantic trade of the time. Later, in 1883, the Bank of Nova Scotia acquired the Union Bank of Prince Edward Island, although most of the bank's expansion efforts in the century took the form of branch openings.

The bank launched its branch banking system by opening in Windsor, Nova Scotia. The expansion was limited to the Maritimes until 1882, when the bank moved west by opening a branch in Winnipeg, which later closed, but the bank continued to expand into the American Midwest. This included opening a branch in Minneapolis in 1885, which later transferred to Chicago in 1892. Following the collapse of the Commercial Bank of Newfoundland and Union Bank of Newfoundland on December 10, 1894, the Bank of Nova Scotia established on December 15, 1894, in Newfoundland.

The bank opened a branch in Kingston, Jamaica, in 1889 to facilitate the trading of sugar, rum, and fish. This was Scotiabank's first move into the Caribbean and historically the first branch of a Canadian bank to open outside of the United States or the United Kingdom. In 1899, Scotiabank opened a branch in Boston, Massachusetts. By the end of the 19th century, the bank was represented in all of the Maritimes, Quebec, Ontario, and Manitoba.

=== 1900–1960s: Expansion and domestic consolidation ===
In 1900, the bank moved its headquarters to Toronto, Ontario.

The bank continued to grow with the opening of new branches in the early 20th century. In 1906, the Bank of Nova Scotia opened a branch in Havana, Cuba, followed by a branch in Old City in the following year. In 1910, the bank opened a branch in San Juan, Puerto Rico. The bank also grew with the merger and acquisition of other banks, including the Bank of New Brunswick in 1913, and the Toronto-based Metropolitan Bank in 1914. The acquisition of Metropolitan Bank made the Bank of Nova Scotia the fourth largest financial institution in Canada at that time. In 1919, the bank amalgamated with the Bank of Ottawa.

In 1919, the bank opened a branch in Fajardo, Puerto Rico. In the following year, the bank opened a branch in London, and another in Santo Domingo, Dominican Republic. The bank also saw growth in Cuba, with five branches in Havana, and one branch each in Camagüey, Cienfuegos, Manzanillo, and Santiago de Cuba by 1931.

During the mid-20th century, the bank grew not only in size but also in breadth of products and services. Progress was conditioned by changing consumer needs, legal changes, or acquisitions of external service providers. Major changes include: Following the passage of the National Housing Act, the Bank of Nova Scotia created a mortgage department in 1954. Further changes to the Bank Act of 1954 in 1958 led to the bank introducing its consumer credit program.

The bank's branches in Cuba continued to operate until 1960, when the Government of Cuba nationalized all banks in Cuba, and the Bank of Nova Scotia withdrew its services from all eight branches. During the 1960s, the Bank of Nova Scotia became the first Canadian bank to appoint women as bank managers, with the first appointed on September 11, 1961. In the next year, the bank expanded into Asia with the opening of a Representative Office in Japan.

=== 1970s–1990s: International expansion ===
In 1975, the Bank of Nova Scotia adopted Scotiabank as its worldwide brand name. On September 28, 1978, Scotiabank and Canadian Union of Public Employees signed a collective agreement in Toronto, making Scotiabank the first Canadian bank to sign a collective agreement with a union.

In 1986, Scotiabank created Scotia Securities to provide discount brokerage and security underwriting services. The late 1980s and 1990s saw the bank acquire several firms, including McLeod Young Weir brokerage firm (co-founded by Donald Ivan McLeod, William Ewart Young, James Gordon Weir and John Henry (Harry) Ratcliffe in 1921) in 1988, and Montreal Trustco Inc. in 1994.

=== 1997–2019: Previous metals leadership ===
In 1997, the bank acquired National Trust Company for Can$1.25 billion. In the same year, Scotiabank acquired Banco Quilmes in Argentina.

In 2000, Scotiabank increased its stake in Mexican bank Grupo Financiero Inverlat to 55 percent. The Mexican bank was subsequently renamed to Grupo Financiero Scotiabank Inverlat. Scotiabank later acquired Inverlat banking house in 2003, taking over all of its branches and establishing a strong presence in the country.

In 2002, Scotiabank shut its branches (formerly Banco Quilmes) in Argentina during the currency crisis and massive sovereign default. In the following year, Scotiabank's Guangzhou branch was awarded the first licence to a Canadian bank by the Chinese government to deal in Chinese currency. In 2007, Scotiabank acquired a 24.98 per cent stake in Thanachart Bank, with that share later increasing to 48.99 per cent by December 2014. With the acquisition of Siam City Bank, Thanachart Bank is now the 6th largest bank (by assets) in Thailand with over 16,000 staff serving more than four million customers through 680 branches and 2,100 ATMs across the country.

In 2010, the bank opened its first offices in Bogotá, Colombia. On October 20, 2011, Scotiabank acquired a 51 per cent stake in Colpatria, Colombia's fifth largest bank and second largest issuer of credit cards, for $1 billion Canadian in cash and stock (10 million shares). It is the second largest foreign transaction ever by a Canadian financial company overseas, behind Royal Bank of Canada's purchase in Royal Bank of Trinidad and Tobago.

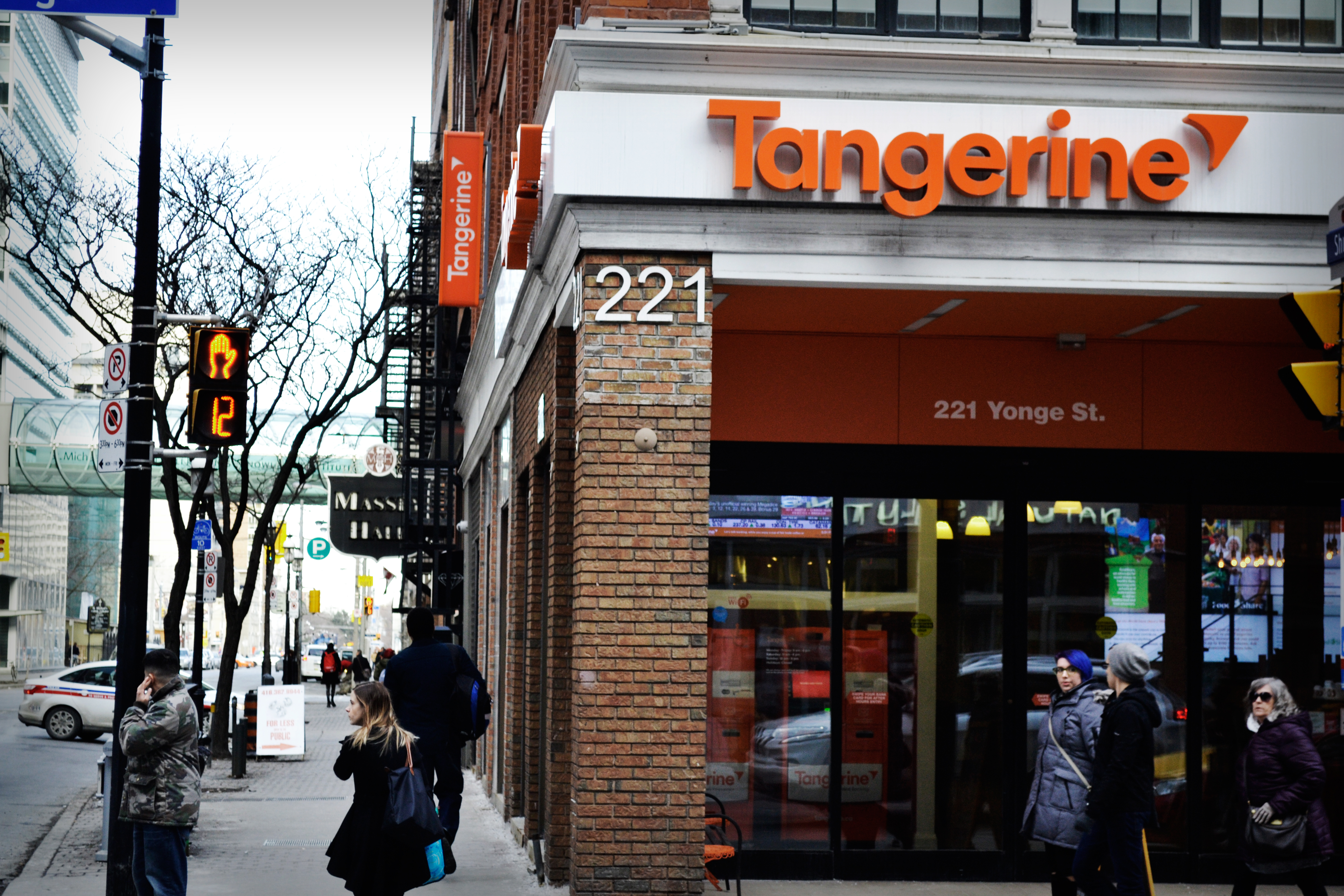
A Tangerine "cafe" in Toronto. Tangerine is a subsidiary of Scotiabank that was acquired in 2012.

In 2012, Scotiabank entered into an agreement to acquire ING Direct Bank of Canada from ING Groep N.V. Two years later, Scotiabank would acquire ING Direct Bank of Canada for Can$3.13 billion. The sale completed on November 15, 2012, and ING Bank of Canada was later renamed Tangerine in April 2014.

As a result of the FATCA agreement between Canada and the United States, signed between the two countries in 2014, Scotiabank has also spent almost $100 million implementing a controversial system to report to the United States the account holdings of close to one million Canadians of American origin and their Canadian-born spouses. Scotiabank has been forced to implement this system in order to comply with FATCA. According to Financial Post, FATCA requires Canadian banks to provide information to the United States including total assets, account balances, account numbers, transactions, account numbers, and other personal identifying information, as well as assets held jointly with Canadian-born spouses and other family members.

On July 14, 2015, Scotiabank announced that it would buy Citigroup's retail and commercial banking operations in Panama and Costa Rica. Terms of the transaction were not disclosed. The purchase would increase Scotiabank's client base in both countries from 137,000 to 387,000, and would add 27 branches to the existing 51 branches in both Central American nations.

Scotiabank's former president, CEO and Chairman Cedric Ritchie died on March 20, 2016. He was a President of Scotiabank from 1972, and CEO and chairman from 1974 to 1995. Under his leadership, Scotiabank expanded into more than 40 countries and grew to 33,000 employees.

In 2017, Scotiabank join Enterprise Ethereum Alliance.

In 2018, Scotiabank acquired Montreal investment firm Jarislowsky Fraser, also in 2018 Scotiabank completed the acquisition of a 68.19 per cent stake in BBVA Chile for Can$2.9 billion, as a result BBVA Chile was merged into Scotiabank Chile. On February 21, 2019, the Prosecutor in the Central American country of Costa Rica raided Scotiabank's offices in San José, Costa Rica, claiming that the bank had failed to provide the government with information on accounts and deposits that could allegedly implicate Alejandro Toledo, the former president of Peru, in money laundering. Later that year, in June 2019 it was announced that OFG Bancorp would acquire all branches of Scotiabank within Puerto Rico and the United States Virgin Islands territories as part of a $550 million cash deal.

In 2019, Scotiabank underwent a rebranding, modifying its wordmark logo and introducing a new corporate font based on its design, downplaying the company's S and globe monogram, and increasing use of the abbreviated name "Scotia".

=== 2020–present: Modern era and leadership changes ===
In 2022, the management tried to reduce the rate of remote work.

On February 14, 2024, Chief Executive Officer and Group Head, Global Banking and Markets Jake Lawrence left the bank after 22 years and joined the Power Corporation of Canada. His responsibilities are shared between Paul Scurfield to Global Head, Capital Markets, Global Banking and Markets, and Michael Kruse, acting as Interim Global Head, Corporate and Investment Banking, Global Banking and Markets.

In February 2024, Bank of Nova Scotia announced the creation of first indigenous-owned investment dealer in Canada. Cedar Leaf Capital is a partnership between two indigenous development corporations and one indigenous peoples corporation. Each side owns 23.3% of the shares and Scotiabank controls the rest. At the same time, the bank will reduce its share once Cedar Leaf Capital has established its production. This initiative will facilitate access by aboriginal people (5% of Canada's 40 million people) to investment and infrastructure development.

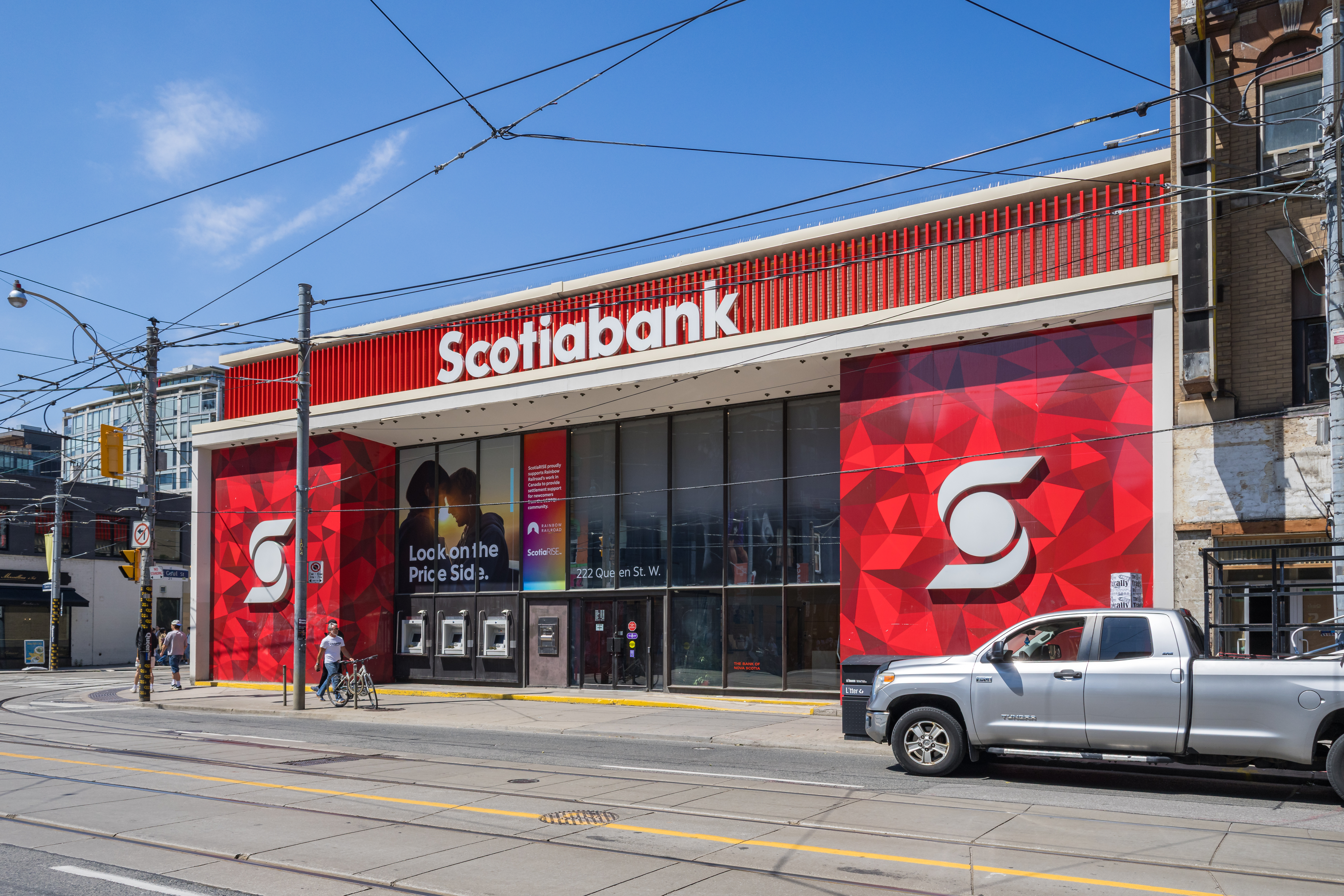
A Scotiabank branch on Toronto's Queen Street in 2026

In August 2024, Scotiabank and KeyCorp (a U.S. regional bank) announced that Scotiabank was purchasing 14.9% of KeyCorp for approximately $2.8 billion. The parties expect to complete the purchase upon the satisfaction of customary closing conditions and the receipt of Federal Reserve approval, which is expected to occur in the first quarter of 2025. As part of the transaction, KeyCorp and Scotiabank plan to explore commercial opportunities to partner together in the future to best serve their respective client bases.

In November 2024, some customers were unable to access their accounts for days.

In January 2025, the signing of an agreement to purchase the remaining stake (43.9%) in Scotiabank Colpatria (Colombia) is announced, in turn announcing a merger agreement in some Latin American countries through which Scotiabank will hold 20% of Davivienda, and the latter will absorb Scotiabank Colombia, Panama and Costa Rica, operations that in any case will be subject to regulatory approvals throughout 2025.

In June 2025, Scotiabank appointed Alton McDowell, formerly of JPMorgan Chase, as its Global Head of Corporate Banking.

== Acquisitions and mergers ==
The bank has amalgamated with several other Canadian financial institutions through the years and purchased several other banks overseas. Most have been rebranded since their acquisition, although a few continue to utilize their former names. Several branches of the former Montreal Trust and National Trust were rebranded Scotiabank & Trust, and continue to operate as such.

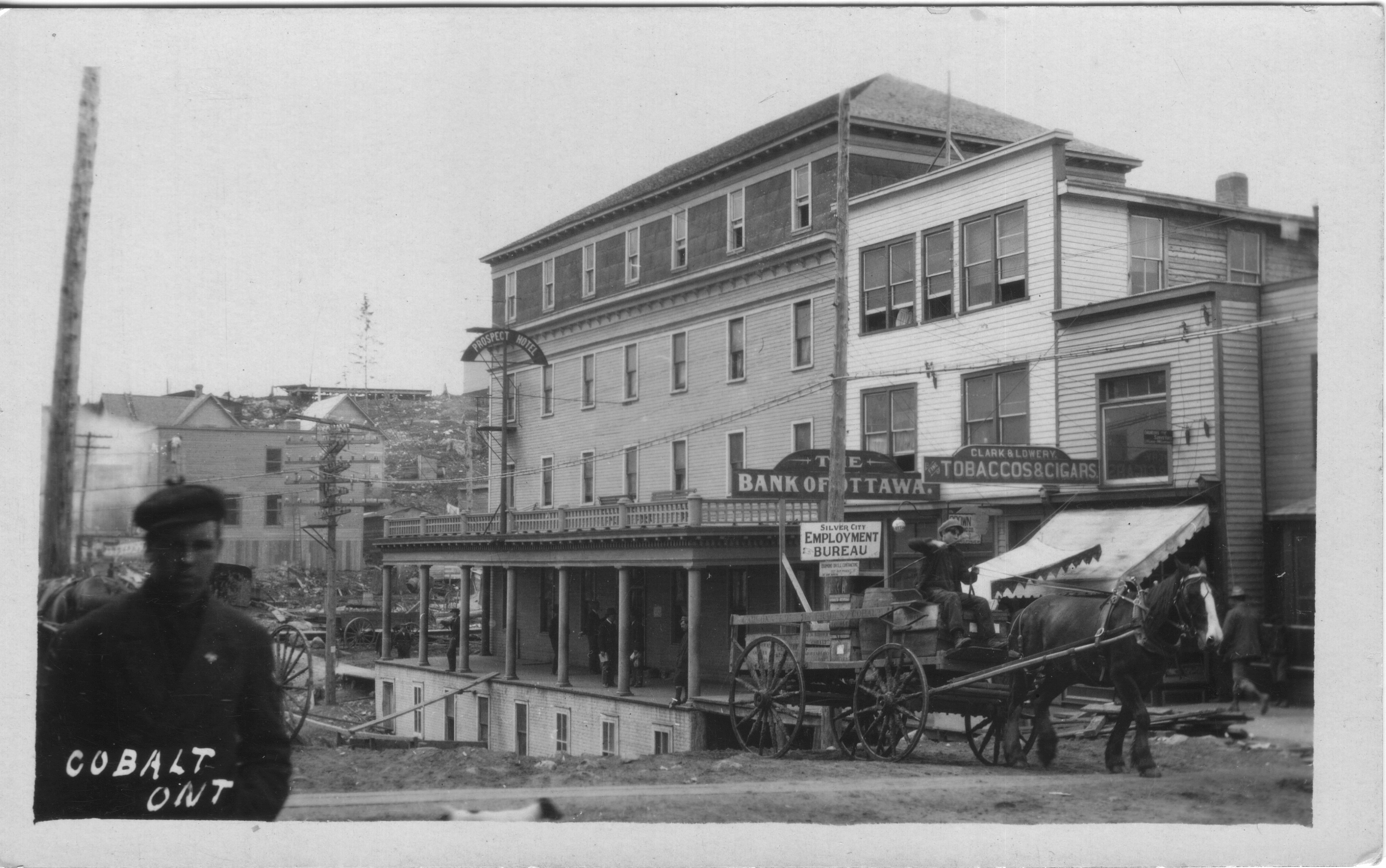
A Bank of Ottawa branch in Cobalt. The bank was acquired by the Bank of Nova Scotia in 1919.

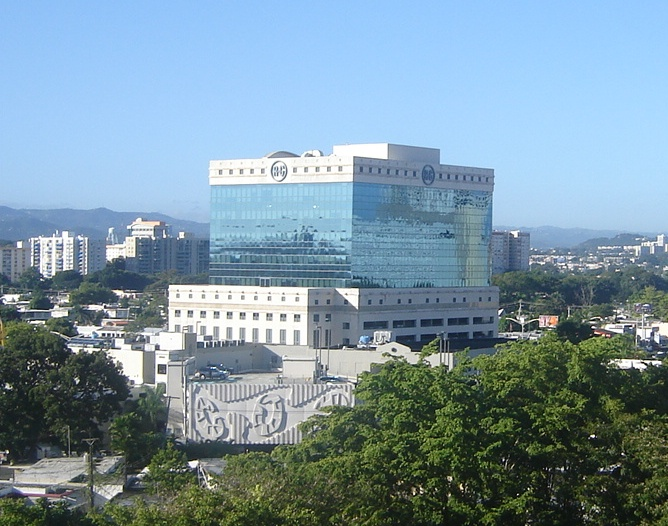
Headquarters for R & G Financial in San Juan, 2006. R & G was later acquired by Scotiabank in 2010.

List of banks merged with or acquired by Scotiabank
Bank	Year established	Year of amalgamation
(Canada) Union Bank of PEI	1860	1883
(Canada) Summerside Bank	1866	1901
(Canada) Bank of New Brunswick	1820	1913
Metropolitan Bank of Canada	1902	1914
(Canada) Bank of Ottawa	1874	1919
(Canada) Montreal Trust Company	1889	1994
(Canada) National Trust Company	1898	1997
(United Kingdom) Mocatta Bullion	1684	1997, Scotiabank acquires Mocatta Bullion from Standard Chartered
(Mexico) Inverlat	1991	1992, Scotiabank acquires 5% stake
National Bank of Greece (Canada)	1982	2005
(Peru) Banco Wiese Sudameris	1920	2006
(Dominican Republic) Banco Intercontinental	1986	2003
(Peru) Banco Sudamericano	1991	1997, Scotiabank acquires 25% of Peru's Banco Sudamericano
E-Trade Canada	1982	2008
(Canada) DundeeWealth	1998	2010
(United States) R-G Premier Bank of Puerto Rico	1966	2010
(Uruguay) Nuevo Banco Comercial	2003	2011
ING Direct Canada	1997	2012, rebranded to Tangerine in 2013
(Colombia) Banco Colpatria	1955	2012, Scotiabank acquires 51% of the stakes in Banco Colpatria
(Uruguay) Discount Bank		2015, Scotiabank acquires Discount Bank Uruguay
(Canada) Canadian Tire Bank	2003	2014, Scotiabank acquires 20% stake
(Canada) Jarislowsky Fraser	1955	2018
(Canada) MD Financial Management	1957	2018
BBVA Chile	1883	2018, Scotiabank acquires 68.19% stake
(Colombia) (Panama) (Costa Rica) (Honduras) (El Salvador) Davivienda	1972	2025, Scotiabank acquires 20% of the stakes in Banco Davivienda, Davivienda absorb Scotiabank operations in Colombia, Panama and Costa Rica

== Operating units ==
Scotiabank has four business lines:

- Canadian Banking provides financial advice and banking to personal and business customers across Canada. Scotiabank also provides an alternative self-directed banking method through Tangerine Bank.
- International Banking provides financial products and advice to retail and commercial customers in select regions outside of Canada, supplemented by additional products and services offered by Global Banking & Markets and Global Wealth & Insurance.
- Global Wealth & Insurance (GWI) combines the Bank's wealth management and insurance operations in Canada and internationally, and Global Transaction Banking. GWI is diversified across geographies and product lines.
- Global Banking & Markets, Scotiabank's wholesale banking and capital markets arm, offers various products and services to corporate, government and institutional investor clients globally.

Financial highlights, by year
Measure	2001	2002	2003	2004	2005	2006	2007	2008	2009	2010	2011	2012	2013	2014	2015	2016	2017	2018
Revenues, bn Can$	10.365	10.727	10.261	10.295	10.726	11.208	12.490	11.876	14.457	15.505	17.310	19.646	21.299	23.604	24.049	26.350	27.155	28.775
Net income, bn $	2.077	1.708	2.422	2.908	3.209	3.579	4.045	3.140	3.547	4.239	5.330	6.390	6.610	7.298	7.213	7.368	8.243	8.724
Assets, bn $	284.4	296.4	285.9	279.2	314.0	379.0	411.5	507.6	496.5	526.7	594.4	668.2	743.6	805.7	856.5	896.3	915.3	998.5
Employees	46,804	44,633	43,986	43,928	46,631	54,199	58,113	69,049	67,802	70,772	75,362	81,497	86,690	86,932	89,214	88,901	88,645	97,629
Branches	2005	1847	1850	1871	1959	2191	2331	2672	2686	2784	2926	3123	3330	3288	3177	3113	3003	3,095

Senior debt credit ratings (May 2014)
Agency	Rating	
DBRS	AA	Stable
Fitch	AA-	Stable
Moody's	Aa2	Stable
Standard & Poor's	A+	Stable

=== Branch and office locations ===
==== Canadian ====
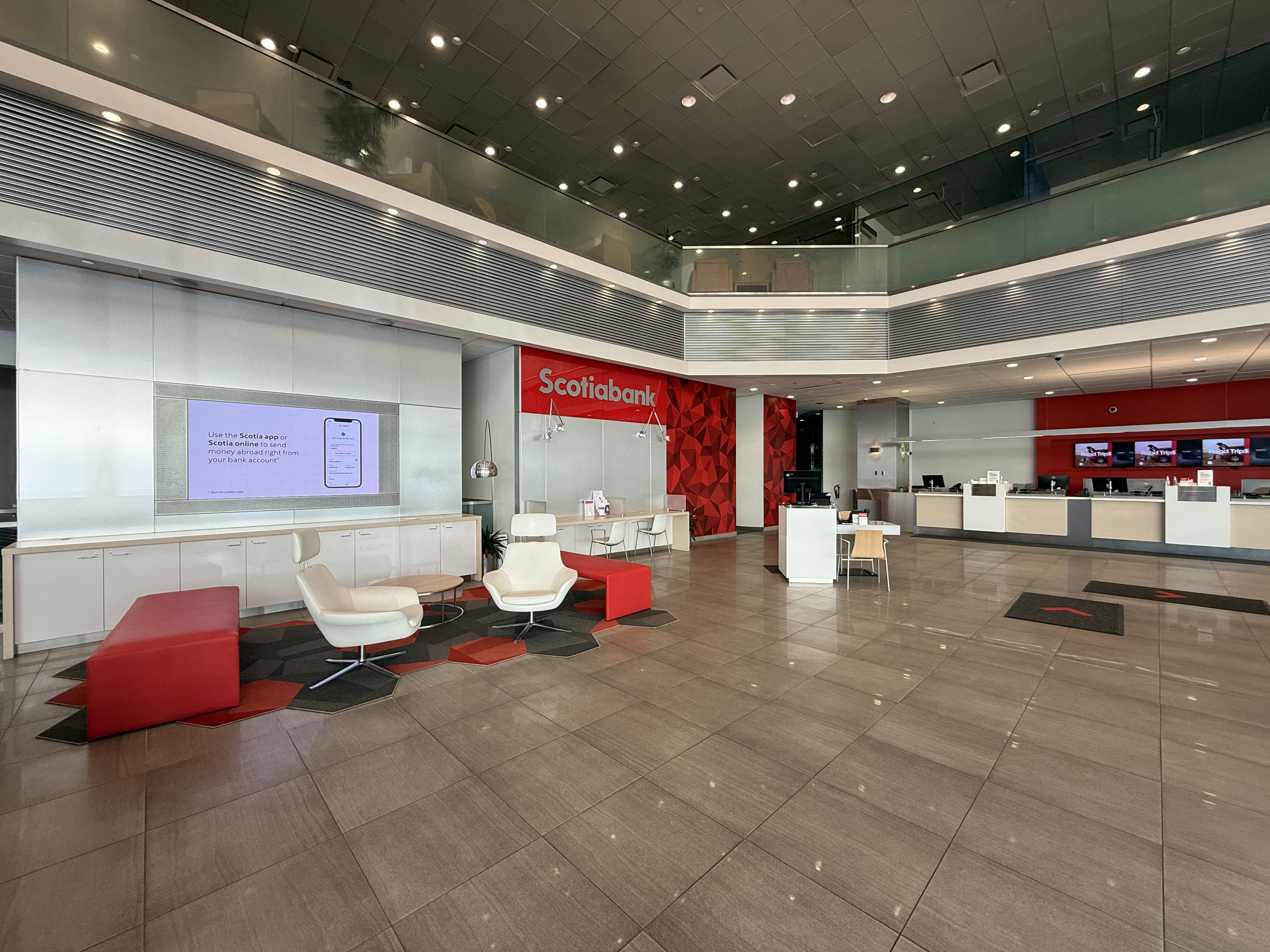
A Scotiabank branch in Vancouver, Canada

Scotiabank operates branches in all Canadian provinces and territories, except for Nunavut.

==== Global ====
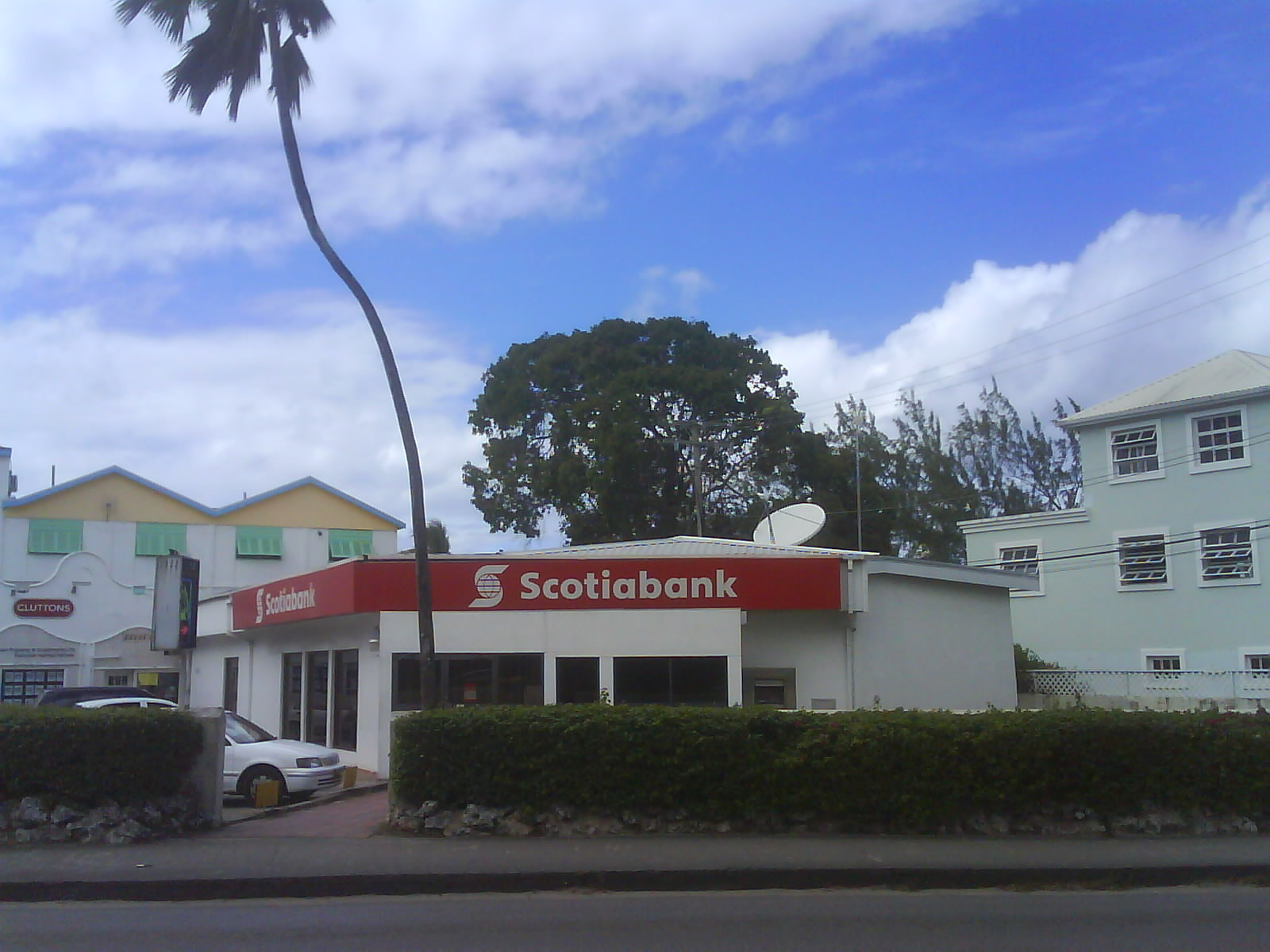
A Scotiabank branch in Holetown, Barbados

- Aruba
- Australia
- Bahamas
- Barbados
- Brazil
- Cayman Islands
- Chile
- China
- Colombia
- Costa Rica
- Cuba
- Curaçao
- Dominican Republic
- Egypt
- France
- Guyana
- Hong Kong
- India
- Ireland
- Jamaica
- Republic of Korea
- Luxembourg
- Malaysia
- Mexico
- Netherlands
- Panama
- Peru
- Russia
- Sint Eustatius
- Singapore
- Taiwan
- Thailand
- Trinidad and Tobago
- Turkey
- Turks and Caicos Islands
- United Kingdom
- Uruguay
- United Arab Emirates
- Venezuela
- Vietnam

== Controversies ==
=== Major investor in UN-blacklisted Israeli bank and arms manufacturer ===
One of Scotiabank mutual funds is the largest foreign investor of the UNHRC-blacklisted Israeli bank Mizrahi Tefahot Bank, which invests in illegal settlements in Palestinian Territories. The same mutual fund is also heavily invested in the Israeli weapon manufacturer Elbit.

1832 Asset Management, a division of Scotiabank's Dynamic Fund held 5 per cent of Elbit, valued at about US$440 million, until May 14, 2024, when it disclosed in a regulatory filing that the halved their investments to 2.5 per cent, valued at about US$237.6 million.

=== Fraud in Mexico ===
A 2001 investigation into the murder of Maru Oropesa, a Scotiabank branch manager in Mexico City, revealed US$14 million missing from the branch. Initially, investigators found that Oropesa and Jaime Ross, her former boss, had illegally transferred US$5 million from client investment accounts. The money was eventually transferred to the United States where it was used to purchase three aircraft. As the investigation continued, officials found an additional $9 million missing and involvement of 16 other bank employees in the fraud. Ross was convicted of fraud and money laundering for his role and sentenced to 15 years. Scotiabank terminated the other 16 employees, but did not prosecute them.

=== Unpaid overtime lawsuit ===
In 2014, the bank reached a settlement in a class-action lawsuit that covered thousands of workers owed more than a decade of unpaid overtime. The lawsuit included 16,000 Scotiabank employees across Canada who worked as personal banking officers, senior personal banking officers, financial advisors, and small business account managers from January 1, 2000, to December 1, 2013. The 2007 lawsuit was similar to a class-action filed by Canadian Imperial Bank of Commerce (CIBC) bank teller Dara Fresco of Toronto.

Under terms of the settlement, employees received 1.5 times their standard wage at the time, but no interest. Scotiabank also paid legal fees of $10.45 million.

=== Wrongful dismissal lawsuit ===
In June 2005, David Berry, a very successful Canadian Scotiabank trader who had built a $75 million/year business in trading preferred shares, was fired on the grounds that he had committed securities regulatory violations. At the time, as part of a 20 per cent direct drive deal, he was making more than double the CEO's salary and Scotiabank management had already taken steps to limit his compensation. The regulatory violation allegations from his former employer, left him unemployable to Scotiabank's competitors despite the appeal of potentially adding more than $75 million/year to their equity trading profits.

Documents delivered to the media showing that Scotiabank management had sought advice on terminating Berry prior to the Investment Industry Regulatory Organization of Canada (IIROC) violation accusation, and the results of questioning during the IIROC inquiries strongly suggest that the securities charges were part of a plan by Scotiabank senior management to remove Berry from his position and simultaneously prevent him from becoming their competitor.

In a ruling on January 15, 2013, more than seven years after the initial accusation, a hearing panel of the IIROC dismissed all charges against Berry.

David Berry filed a $100 million wrongful dismissal lawsuit against Scotiabank. As of January 2015, and nine years after Berry was terminated, Scotiabank settled with Berry for an undisclosed amount. Barry Critchley, who followed the story since its beginning, wrote an article on November 6, 2014, in which he believes Scotiabank's $55 million reported legal charges would likely be connected to the $100 million lawsuit; but it is unlikely to ever be known.

== Sponsorship ==
=== Sports ===
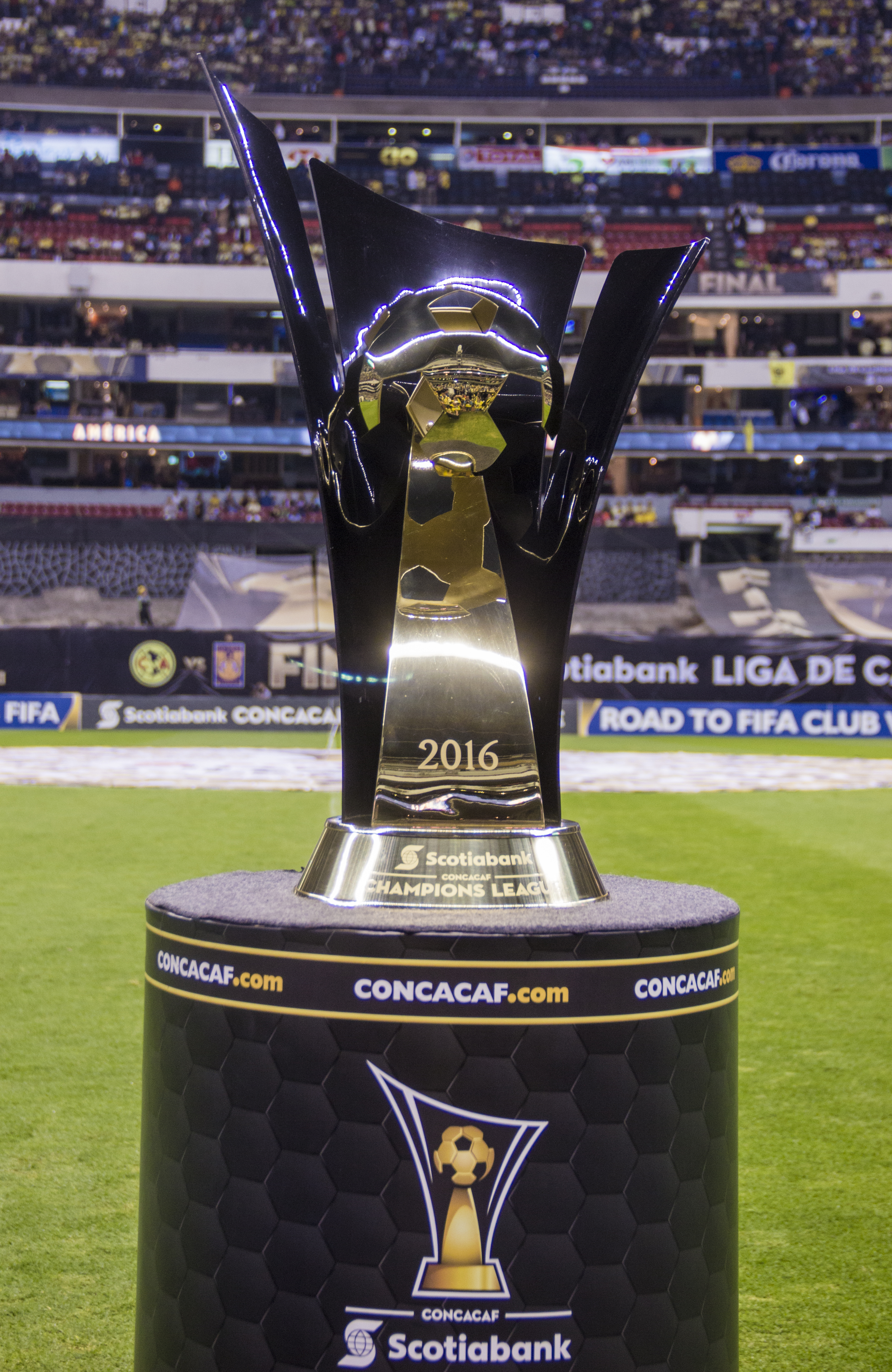
The CONCACAF Champions League trophy. Scotiabank is the title sponsor for the event.

Scotiabank is the title sponsor for a number of sports events including the Calgary Marathon, the CONCACAF Champions League tournament (since 2015), and the Jewish National Fund's "Pitch for Israel" event. Scotiabank is also the title sponsor for running events that form a part of the Canada Running Series. They include Banque Scotia 21k de Montreal + 10k & 5k in April; Scotiabank Vancouver Half-Marathon & 5k Run/Walk in June; Scotiabank Toronto Waterfront Marathon, Half-Marathon & 5k in October; and the Scotiabank Bluenose Marathon. Since 2005, Scotiabank has also been the title sponsor of the CFL playoffs semi-final and conference final games, with games titled as the Scotiabank East Semi-finals and Scotiabank West Semi-finals. This is in addition to being the official financial services provider to the Canadian Football League. Scotiabank was also a primary sponsor for Champion Boxer Miguel Cotto during his 2009 bout with Manny Pacquiao.

Scotiabank also sponsors sports leagues and teams, becoming a sponsor for Club Deportivo Guadalajara in 2013, and becoming the official sponsor for the Chilean Primera División after signing a five-year period contract in 2014. Scotiabank is also the official bank of the National Hockey League and National Hockey League Players' Association. It was named official bank of the 2007 Cricket World Cup. In 2010, Scotiabank was a sponsor of the World Rally Championship's Corona Rally Mexico. Since 2008, Scotiabank has been the official team sponsor of the Canadian cricket Team and the title sponsor of National T20 Championship in Canada.

Scotiabank is also the official bank of the West Indies cricket team.

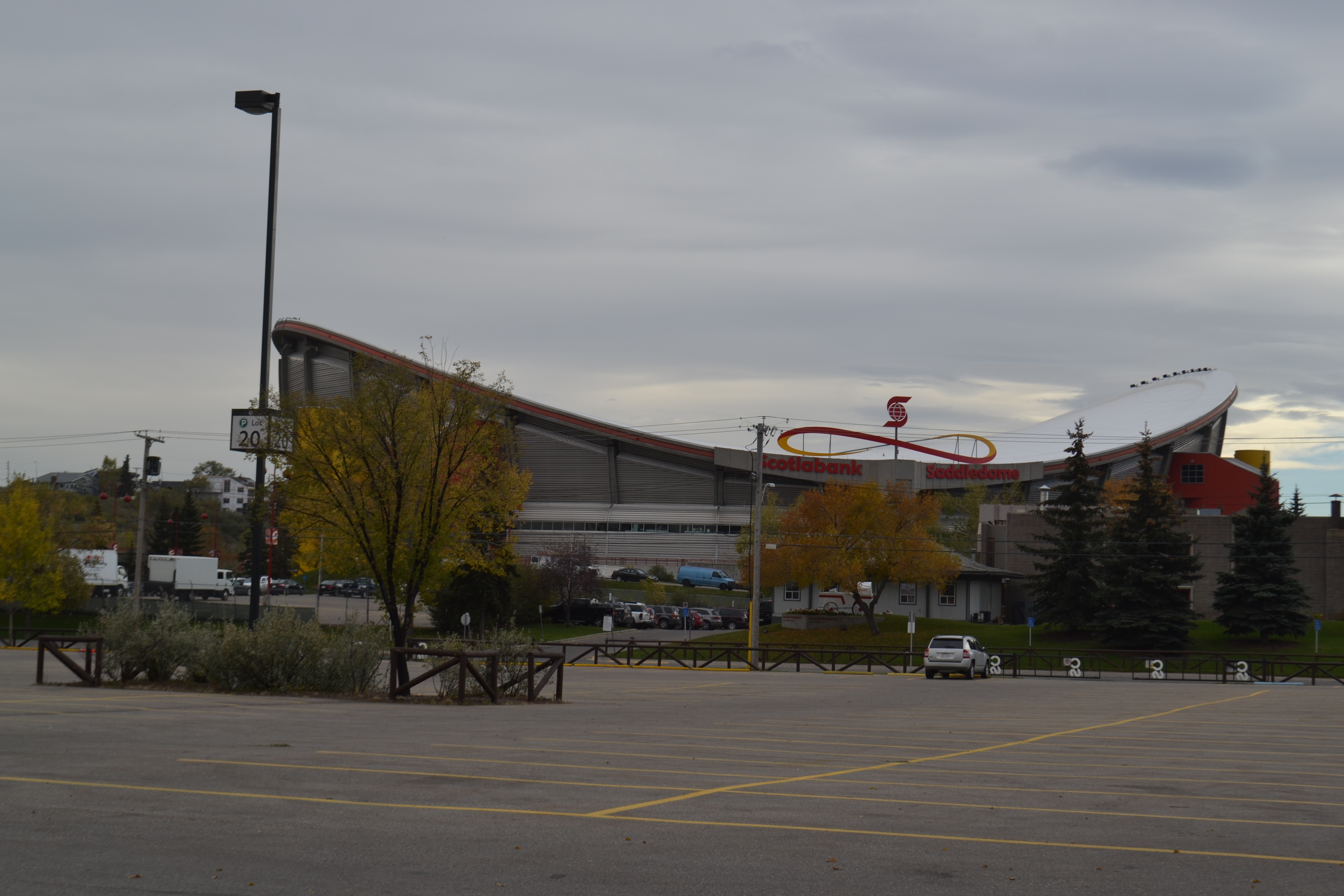
The Scotiabank Saddledome in Calgary. The bank has held the arena's naming rights since October 2010.

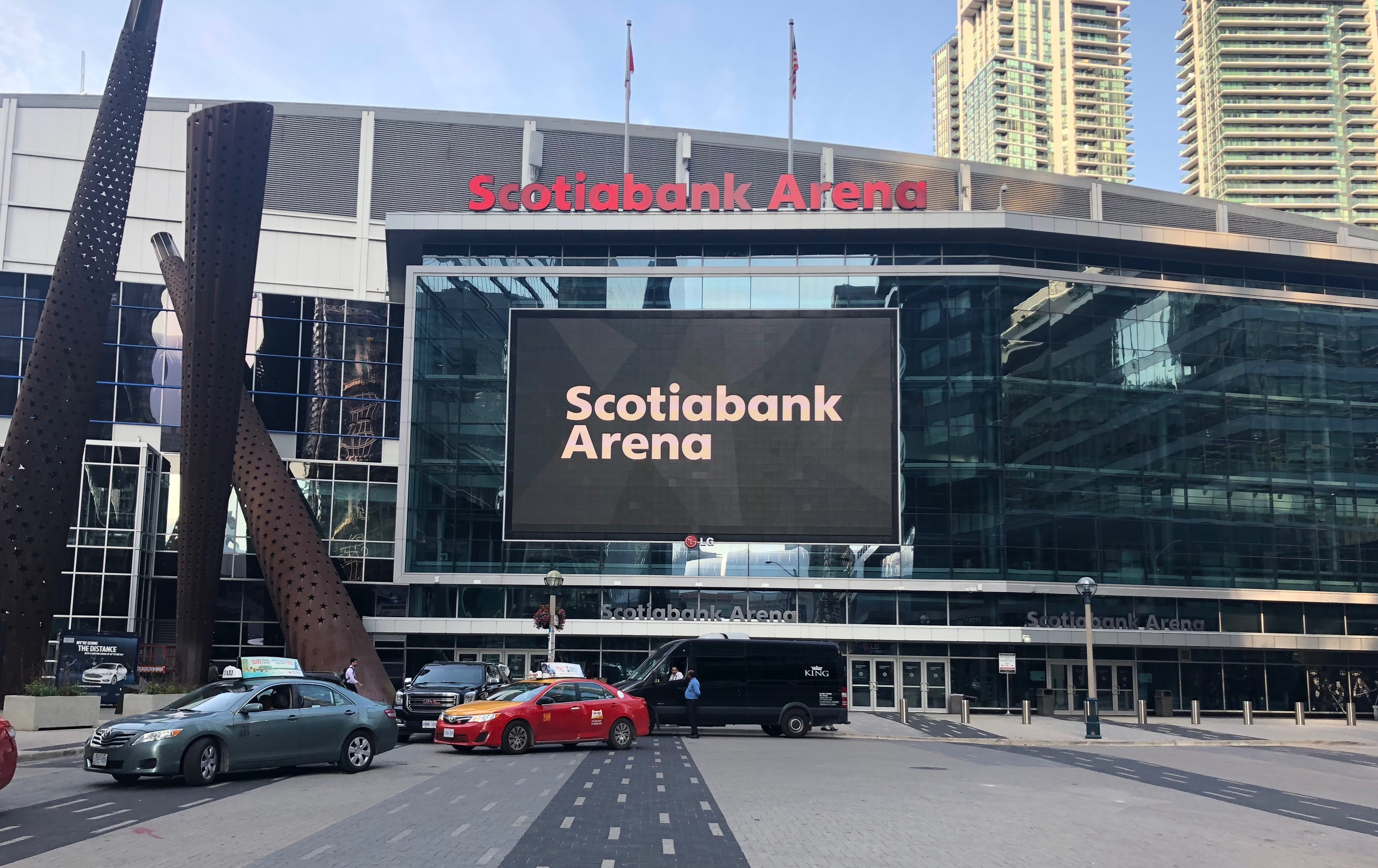
The Scotiabank Arena in Toronto. The bank has held the arena's naming rights since July 2018.

Scotiabank is also the title sponsor for a number of athletic facilities. They include the Scotiabank Aquatics Center in Zapopan, Mexico; Scotiabank Saddledome in Calgary (since October 8, 2010); and the Scotiabank Centre in Halifax (since June 25, 2014). The naming rights for the Scotiabank Centre was signed for ten years, with annual fees of $650,000 for said rights. The facility officially opened its doors as the rebranded Scotiabank Centre on September 19, 2014. On August 29, 2017, Scotiabank and Maple Leaf Sports & Entertainment, announced that Scotiabank purchased the naming rights to the Air Canada Centre in Toronto for $800 million, a record-setting deal described as "one of the biggest investments in naming rights in North America". The multi-sport complex was renamed July 1, 2018, as Scotiabank Arena. From 2006 through 2013, Scotiabank held the naming rights to the arena of the Ottawa Senators, branding it Scotiabank Place. Canadian Tire took over the naming rights for the Senators' arena in June 2013. In 2022, Scotiabank acquired the naming rights to the Bell MTS Iceplex near Winnipeg; rather than use the Scotiabank name, the facility is instead branded as Hockey for All Centre, as an extension of a diversity and inclusion campaign of the same name.

=== Culture ===
Scotiabank has been a title sponsor for a number of cultural events and institutions in Canada. In 2005, Scotiabank became title sponsor of the Giller Prize. From 2006 to 2015, Scotiabank was the title sponsor for the Nuit Blanche event in Toronto. In 2008, Scotiabank announced a two-year sponsorship of Toronto's Caribana which would be rebranded as Scotiabank Caribbean Carnival Toronto. The sponsorship of the Caribbean festival was extended until 2015, when the partnership with the festival ended. In 2016 Scotiabank held its first hackathon with the goal of solving Canadian debt.

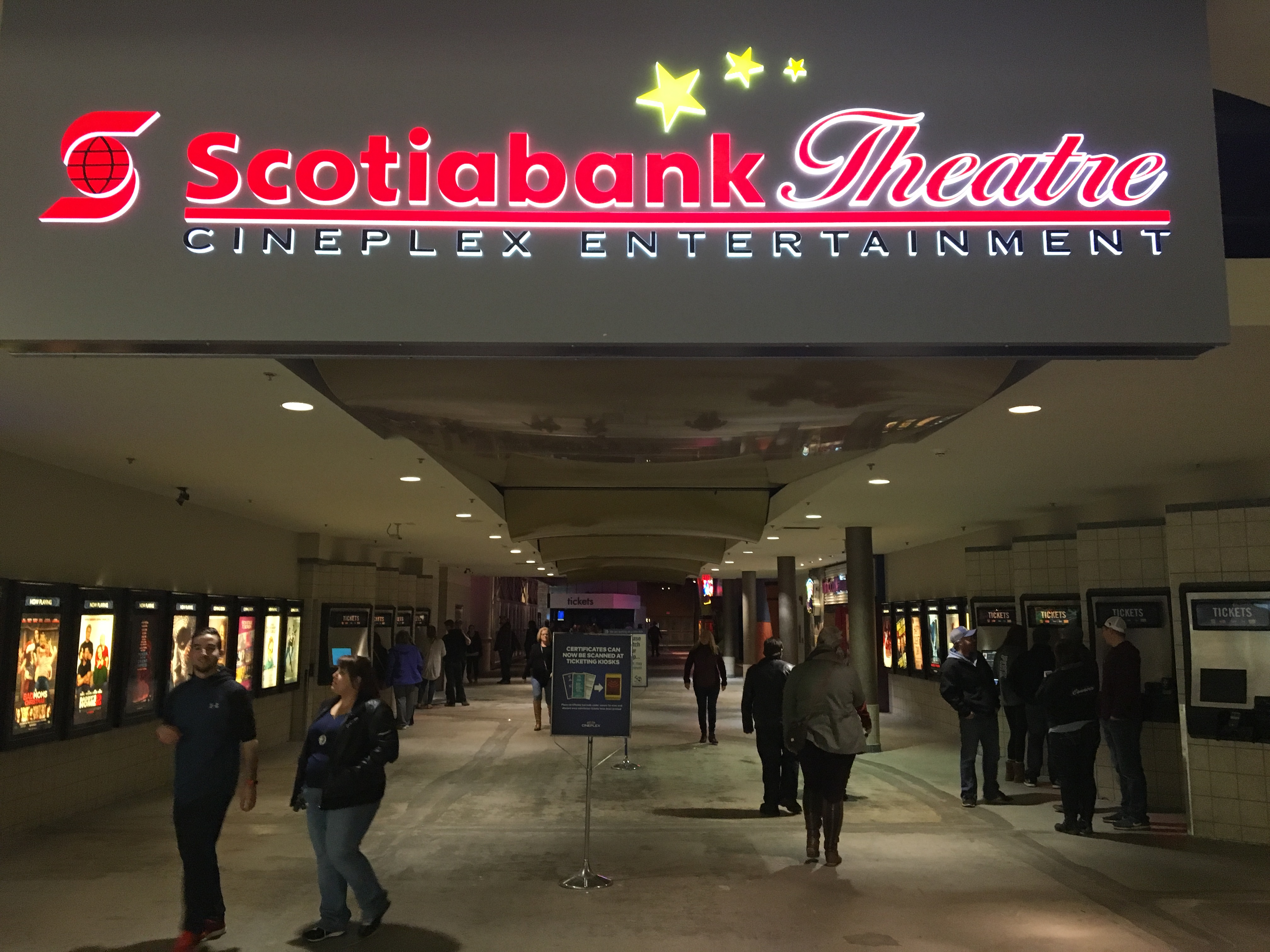
Several Cineplex Entertainment theatres have been branded as "Scotiabank Theatre" since 2007.

Scotiabank and Canadian theatre operator Cineplex Entertainment partnered in 2007 to create a loyalty rewards program called Scene+. The program allows patrons to sign up for a special card that grants them points which can be redeemed for free movies or concession discounts. Scotiabank customers can also request a debit card which gives them points when used, and a Visa credit card was launched in early May. Five Cineplex Entertainment locations were also rebranded as "Scotiabank Theatres". In 2015, the two companies announced they extended the partnership through October 31, 2025, and would expand naming rebrand another five theatres as Scotiabank Theatres. On December 14, 2021, the new Scene+ program was launched. It merged Scene and Scotia Rewards points.

Scotiabank is also the title sponsor for two post-secondary facilities in Canada, including Scotiabank Hall at Brock University in St. Catharines; and Scotiabank Hall in the Marion McCain Arts and Social Sciences Building at Dalhousie University in Halifax. Scotiabank has also established an industry partnership with the University of Waterloo Stratford Campus.

== Awards ==
- 2005 – "Bank of the Year" – For Mexico, the Caribbean and in Jamaica by LatinFinance.
- 2007 – "Bank of the Year" The Banker – London England, Scotiabank Trinidad and Tobago, Scotiabank Belize, Scotiabank Turks and Caicos
- 2008 – "Bank of the Year" The Banker – London England, Scotiabank Barbados, Scotiabank Trinidad and Tobago, Scotiabank Guyana, Scotiabank Turks and Caicos
- 2009 – "Bank of the Year" The Banker – London England, Scotiabank Canada, Scotiabank Barbados, Scotiabank Dominican Republic, Scotiabank Trinidad and Tobago, Scotiabank Turks and Caicos
- 2010 – "Bank of the Year" The Banker – London England, Scotiabank Barbados, Scotiabank Trinidad and Tobago, Scotiabank Turks and Caicos
- 2011 – "Best Emerging Market Bank" Global Finance Magazine – New York, Scotiabank Jamaica, Scotiabank Barbados, Scotiabank Costa Rica, Scotiabank Turks and Caicos.
- 2012 - "Global Bank of the Year" The Banker "Bank of the Year" for the Americas, Antigua, Barbados, Belize, British Virgin Islands, Canada and Turks and Caicos.
- 2013 – "Bank of the Year" in British Virgin Islands, Canada, Guyana, Jamaica and Trinidad and Tobago by The Banker.
- 2014 – "Best Emerging Market Bank in Latin America" Global Finance Magazine in Jamaica, Barbados, Trinidad & Tobago, Turks and Caicos and U.S. Virgin Islands.

== Membership ==
Scotiabank is a member of the Canadian Bankers Association (CBA) and registered member with the Canada Deposit Insurance Corporation (CDIC), a federal agency insuring deposits at all of Canada's chartered banks. It is also a member of the Global ATM Alliance, a joint venture of several major international banks that allows customers of the banks to use their ATM cards or check cards at certain other banks within the Global ATM Alliance without fees when traveling internationally. Other participating banks are Barclays (United Kingdom), Bank of America (United States), BNP Paribas (France and Ukraine through UkrSibbank), Deutsche Bank (Germany), and Westpac (Australia and New Zealand). Other international associations of which the bank is a member include:

- Amex in Canadian markets
- CarIFS ATM Network (defunct 2020)
- Global ATM Alliance
- Interac
- MAGNA Rewards as part of the Scotiabank MAGNA MasterCard.
- MasterCard in the Caribbean markets
- MultiLink Network ATM network
- NYCE ATM Network
- Plus Network for VISA card users
- VISA International
- UNEPFI as part of the Net Zero Banking Alliance initiative

== Leadership ==
=== President ===
1. William Lawson, 1832–1837
2. Mather Byles Almon, 1837–1870
3. James Donaldson, 1870–1871
4. John Doull, 1871–1872
5. Andrew Mitchell Uniacke, 1872–1874
6. John S. Maclean, 1874–1889
7. John Doull, 1889–1899
8. Jarius Hart, 1899
9. John Young Payzant, 1899–1918
10. Charles Archibald, 1918–1923
11. George Stewart Campbell, 1923–1927
12. Samuel John Moore, 1927–1934
13. John Andrew McLeod, 1934–1945
14. Herbert Deschamps Burns, 1945–1949
15. Horace Luttrell Enman, 1949–1956
16. Charles Sydney Frost, 1956–1958
17. Frank William Nicks, 1958–1970
18. Arthur Holmes Crockett, 1970–1972
19. Cedric Elmer Ritchie, 1972–1979
20. John Alexander Gordon Bell, 1979–1992
21. Peter Cowperthwaite Godsoe, 1992–2003
22. Richard Earl Waugh, 2003–2013
23. Brian Johnston Porter, 2013–2022
24. Lawren Scott Thomson, 2022–

=== Chairman of the Board ===
1. Samuel John Moore, 1933–1945
2. John Andrew McLeod, 1945–1946
3. Herbert Deschamps Burns, 1949–1955
4. Horace Luttrell Enman, 1955–1959
5. Frank William Nicks, 1962–1972
6. Thomas Albert Boyles, 1972–1974
7. Cedric Elmer Ritchie, 1974–1995
8. Peter Cowperthwaite Godsoe, 1995–2004
9. Arthur Richard Andrew Scace, 2004–2009
10. John Thomas Mayberry, 2009–2014
11. Thomas Charles O'Neill, 2014–2019
12. Aaron William Regent, 2019–

=== Chief Executive Officer ===
1. Frank William Nicks, December 1958 – 4 January 1972
2. Thomas Albert Boyles, 4 January 1972 – December 1972
3. Cedric Elmer Ritchie, December 1972 – 19 January 1993
4. Peter Cowperthwaite Godsoe, 19 January 1993 – 1 December 2003
5. Richard Earl Waugh, 2 December 2003 – 31 October 2013
6. Brian Johnston Porter, 1 November 2013 – 31 January 2023
7. Lawren Scott Thomson, 1 February 2023 –

== Arms ==
Coat of arms of Scotiabank
Crest Issuant from a mural crow Argent a sprig of three thistle flowers proper Escutcheon Gules on a fess Argent between in chief and issuant from the fess on water barry wavy of the second and Azure a threemasted ship, the hull Or in full sail pennons flying proper at the stern a banner also of the second charged with a saltire of the third and in base in front of a plough handles to the dexter a garb Or, a cod-fish naiant also proper. Supporters On the dexter side a stag proper gorged with a collar Or pendent therefrom a plate charged with a maple leaf slipped Vert and on the sinister side a unicorn Argent armed, crined, unguled, and gorged with a collar Or pendent therefrom a bezant charged with a saltire Azure. Motto Strength, Integrity, Service

== Bank histories ==
- History of the Bank of Nova Scotia, 1832–1900.
- The Bank of Nova Scotia, 1832–1932.
- Schull, Joseph, and J. Douglas Gibson. The Scotiabank Story: A History of the Bank of Nova Scotia, 1832–1982. Macmillan of Canada, 1982.

== See also ==
- Big Five banks of Canada
- List of largest banks
- List of banks and credit unions in Canada
- List of banks in the Americas
- Scotia
- Scotia Place
- Scotia Plaza
- ScotiaLife Financial
- Scottish-Canadian
- Scotiabank Arena
- Scotiabank Centre
- Scotiabank Saddledome
- John P. Webster
