= Peter Godsoe =

Canadian banker (1938–2023)

Peter Godsoe OC OOnt OJ
- Born: 2 May 1938; Toronto, Ontario
- Died: 13 December 2023 (aged 85); Toronto, Ontario
- Education: University of Toronto (BSc 1961); Harvard University (MBA 1966)
- Spouse: Shelagh Cathleen Reburn (m. 1963)

Peter Cowperthwaite Godsoe OC OOnt OJ (2 May 1938 – 13 December 2023) was a Canadian businessman and president, chairman and chief executive officer of the Bank of Nova Scotia from 1992 to 2003. He was a member of the board of directors of multiple corporations, and served as the chairman of Fairmont Hotels and Resorts and Sobeys.

Born in Toronto, Ontario, the son of J. Gerald "Gerry" and Margaret (Cowperthwaite) Godsoe, he graduated from the University of Toronto Schools before receiving a Bachelor of Science in mathematics and physics from the University of Toronto and an MBA from the Harvard Business School. He was also a Chartered accountant and a Fellow of the Institute of Chartered Accountants of Ontario. Godsoe joined the Bank of Nova Scotia in 1966 as a bank teller, and worked there for his entire career, rising within the company to become president, chairman and CEO.

Godsoe was the chancellor of the University of Western Ontario from 1996 to 2000. In 2001, he was appointed an Officer of the Order of Canada (OC). In 2002, he was appointed Member of the Order of Ontario (OOnt), and was inducted into the Canadian Business Hall of Fame. In 2004, he was made an honorary Commander of the Order of Jamaica (OJ).

Godsoe received honorary degrees from the University of King's College (1993), Concordia University (1995), the University of Western Ontario (2001), and Dalhousie University (2004). He was also awarded the Queen Elizabeth II Golden Jubilee Medal and Diamond Jubilee Medal in 2002 and 2012 respectively.

On December 13, 2023, Godsoe died in Toronto, Ontario, at the age of 85.

Academic offices
Preceded by Reva Gerstein	Chancellor of the University of Western Ontario; 1996–2000	Succeeded by Eleanor Clitheroe
