= Fred H. McNeil =

Canadian banker 1916–1995

Fred H. McNeil AFC
- Born: 17 November 1916; Saskatoon, Saskatchewan
- Died: 26 September 1995 (aged 78); Granum, Alberta
- Spouse: Marian Doreen Williams (m. 1943)
- Military career
- Allegiance: Canada
- Branch: Royal Canadian Air Force
- Service years: 1940–1945
- Rank: Squadron Leader
- Service number: J3099
- Conflicts: World War II

Squadron Leader Frederick Harold McNeil AFC (17 November 1916 – 26 September 1995) was a Canadian air force officer, journalist, businessman, and banker who served as president, chairman, and chief executive officer of the Bank of Montreal. After serving as a flying instructor in World War II, McNeil began his career in British Columbia as a newspaper journalist. In 1954 he left journalism and began working in management and organisation, and in 1960 took a managerial position with Ford Motor Company of Canada. McNeil joined the Bank of Montreal in 1966 and rose quickly through the ranks. He was appointed president in February 1973, chief executive officer in January 1975, and chairman of the board in December 1975. He retired as chairman in July 1981. McNeil died at his ranch in Alberta on 26 September 1995 at age 78.

== Biography ==
Fred McNeil was born in Saskatoon on 17 November 1916 to Harold McNeil and Jean Swan. His name at birth was Archibald Harold Frederick McNeil, though he used the name Frederick Harold McNeil most of his life. After graduating high school in 1934, McNeil attended the University of Manitoba and the University of Saskatchewan, though he does not appear to have graduated.

After the outbreak of war, on 25 May 1940 in Ottawa he enlisted in the Royal Canadian Air Force. McNeil was put into pilot training and received his wings in October 1940 at RCAF Borden, and was commissioned on 30 November. Rather than being sent overseas, McNeil remained in Canada as a flight instructor as part of the British Commonwealth Air Training Plan. On 11 December 1941 he was promoted to Flight Officer, on 15 October 1942 to Flight Lieutenant, and on 1 August 1943 to Squadron Leader. On 13 June 1942, as part of the 1942 Birthday Honours, he was awarded the Air Force Cross. The citation read,

Over a long period this officer has efficiently and conscientiously performed all assigned duties, displaying extreme devotion to duty whilst engaged in his duties as flying instructor. In addition he has displayed great courage on two separate occasions, one when he extricated the personnel of two crashed aircraft under hazardous conditions, and again when he entered a burning building to rescue a brother officer.

The award was presented formally on 3 December 1942 by governor general Alexander Cambridge, 1st Earl of Athlone. McNeil was decommissioned on 29 March 1945.

After the war, McNeil settled in British Columbia and got a job as a newspaper reporter. He worked for the Times Colonist and The Province as city editor and parliamentary correspondent. In 1954 he left journalist and joined Braun & Co. in Vancouver as a management consultant, and then in 1956 joined the Powell River Company as director of management services. In 1960, McNeil moved to Ontario and began working for the Ford Motor Company of Canada with the title of Director, Organization, Personnel & Administration Planning.

On 1 January 1966, McNeil joined the Bank of Montreal as general manager, personnel planning. In November of that year, he was promoted to general manager, organization and personnel. In May 1967 he became vice-president, organization and personnel; in March 1968 executive vice-president, administration; in February 1970 executive vice-president and general manager; and in December 1971 executive vice-president, general manager and chief operating officer.

On 20 February 1973, McNeil succeeded the late J. Leonard Walker as the bank's president. Effective 1 January 1975, William D. Mulholland succeeded McNeil as president. That day, McNeil assumed the duties of chief executive officer from G. Arnold Hart and was appointed deputy chairman. In December 1975, McNeil succeeded Hart as chairman of the board. During his tenure, McNeil moved the office of the chairman to Calgary. After the bank's annual meeting in January 1979, Mulholland succeeded McNeil as chief executive officer. At the bank's annual meeting on 19 January 1981, McNeil announced his retirement as chairman. Effective 1 July 1981, Mulholland succeeded him in as chairman, while William Elwood Bradford succeeded Mulholland as president. Upon his retirement, McNeil settled on the M Bar Ranch near Granum, Alberta. The bank's 1981 annual report included a photograph of McNeil on his ranch, and said, "Mr. McNeil will now devote most of his time to his new career: that of a rancher." McNeil remained a director of the bank through January 1987.

McNeil was a member of the Mount Royal Club, Saint James's Club, Forest and Stream Club, Club St-Denis, Montreal Badminton and Squash Club, Club Laval-sur-le-Lac, Mount Bruno Country Club, Toronto Club, Calgary Petroleum Club, and Ranchmen's Club. He was a director of Dominion Life, Bowater, Canadian Canners, Seagram, MICC Investments, International Resources and Finance Bank, and the Mortgage Insurance Co. of Canada.

On Saturday, 16 January 1943 at High Park United Church in Toronto, McNeil married Marian Doreen Williams (1917–2012). They had three children: Ronald, Marie, and Bruce. McNeil died at his ranch on Tuesday, 26 September 1995 at age 78. A memorial was held on Friday, 6 October at the Ranchmen's Club in Calgary.
