= BMO SmartFolio =

BMO SmartFolio is a digital investment management service offered by Canada’s Bank of Montreal. Broadly referred to as a robo-advisor, the service allows investors to answer a series of questions online about their investment goals, time horizon and risk tolerance, then are recommended a model portfolio made up of index-tracking exchange-traded funds based on the investor’s profile, managed by financial professionals with BMO Global Asset Management and BMO Nesbitt Burns.

== Overview ==
Launched to the public on January 18, 2016 by the bank's full-service investment firm, BMO Nesbitt Burns, it was the first digital portfolio management service offered by Big Five banks of Canada. BMO SmartFolio was developed in-house to appeal to the growing number of investors looking for investment management alternatives to traditional brokerages.

As of December 18, 2017, the minimum amount required to open a BMO SmartFolio account is $1,000, reduced from the $5,000 minimum amount set when the service was originally launched. Account fees are calculated at 0.7 per cent for the first $100,000 invested then are reduced as the account size increases, to 0.4 per cent on assets over $500,000.

The service offers clients the option of holding their investment in TFSA (Tax-Free Savings Account), RRSP (Registered Retirement Savings Plan), RESP (Registered Education Savings Account), RRIF (Registered Retirement Income Fund), as well as non-registered and joint investment accounts.

== Disruption ==
After the 2008 financial crisis, new financial technology startups began offering digital investment management services, or robo-advisors, to meet consumer demands for technology-based solutions to lower the costs of investing. While these online investment management services are most common in the United States, a number are available in Canada, Europe, Australia, India and Asia.

While similar to a robo-advisor service, where investors sign-up online and have digital access to their investment holdings and performance tracking, BMO SmartFolio differs from its peers in the U.S. and UK, in that the portfolios are monitored and managed by a portfolio management group, as opposed to a computer algorithm.

== See also ==
- Customer value maximization
- Financial market infrastructure
