= Bank of Montreal =

Canadian financial services company

Bank of Montreal Banque de Montréal

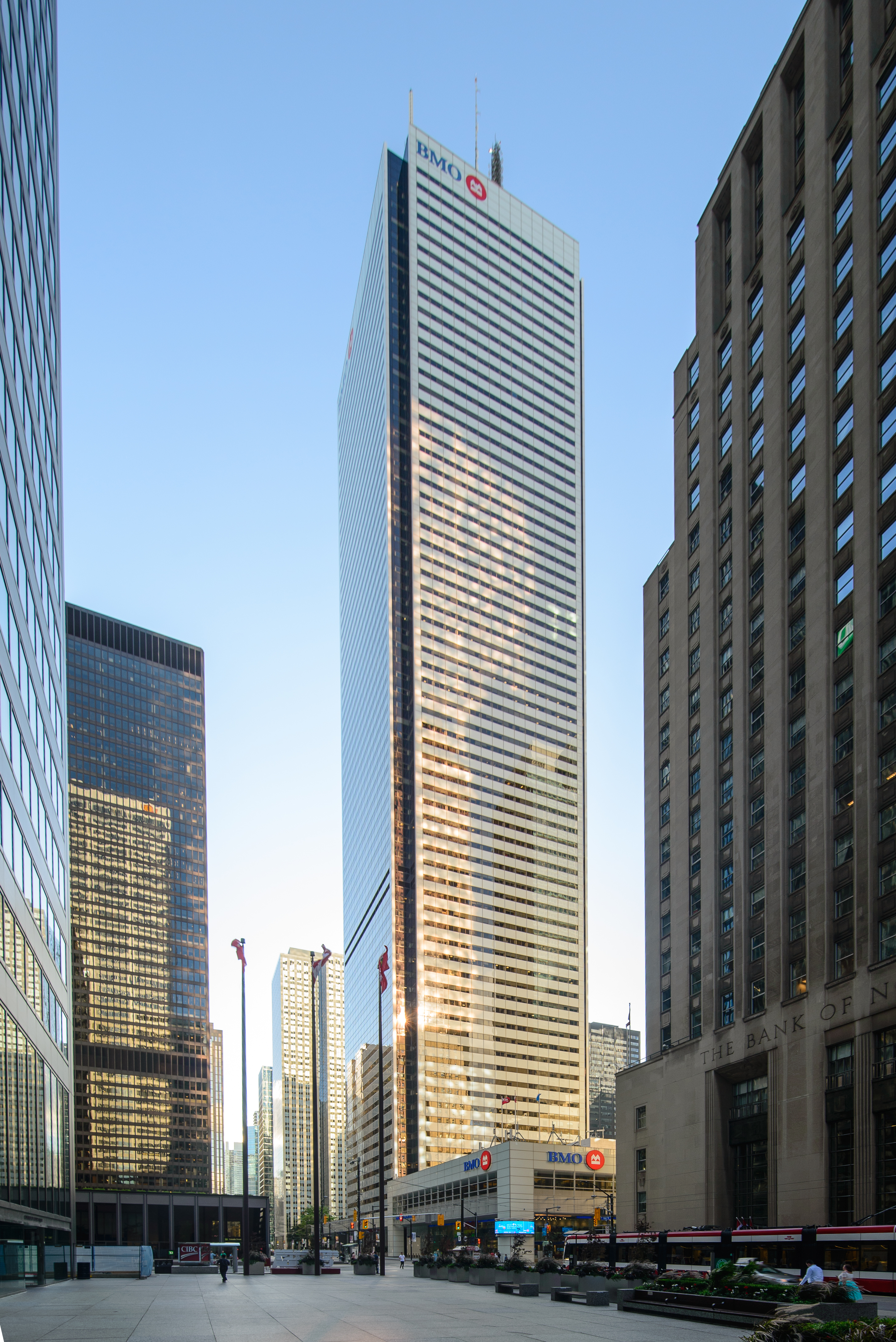
- Operating headquarters in Toronto, Canada
- Trade name: BMO Bank of Montreal; BMO Financial Group (US)
- Native name: Banque de Montréal
- Formerly: Montreal Bank (1817–1822)
- Type: Public
- Traded as: TSX: BMO; NYSE: BMO; S&P/TSX 60 component
- Industry: Financial services
- Founded: 23 June 1817; 209 years ago in Montreal, Lower Canada (as Montreal Bank)
- Headquarters: Bank of Montreal Head Office, Montreal, Quebec, Canada (formal headquarters); Toronto, Ontario, Canada (operating headquarters)
- Key people: Darryl White (CEO); George Cope (chair); Rahul Nalgirkar (CFO)
- Products: Asset management; Banking; Commodities; Credit cards; Equities trading; Insurance; Investment management; Mortgage loans; Private equity; Wealth management
- Revenue: ▲CA$36.27 billion (2025)
- Net income: ▲CA$8.73 billion (2025)
- AUM: ▲CA$506.66 billion (2025)
- Total assets: ▲CA$1.477 trillion (2025)
- Total equity: ▲CA$88.10 billion (2025)
- Number of employees: 53,234 (2025)
- Subsidiaries: BMO Capital Markets; BMO Bank, N.A. BMO Nesbitt Burns; Moneris; Diners Club International (North America Operations); Clearpool Group; Lloyd George Management; LGM Investments; AIG Life Insurance Company of Canada; Radicle Group; Air Miles
- Website: bmo.com

The Bank of Montreal (French: Banque de Montréal, pronounced [bɑ̃k də mɔ̃ʁeal]), abbreviated as BMO (pronounced /ˈbiːmoʊ/ BEE-moh), is a Canadian multinational investment bank and financial services company.

The bank was founded in Montreal, Quebec, in 1817 as Montreal Bank, making it Canada's oldest bank. In 2023, the company's seat in the Forbes Global 2000 was 84. Its head office is in Montreal and its operational headquarters and executive offices are located in Toronto, Ontario, since 1977. It is commonly known by its ticker symbol BMO on both the Toronto Stock Exchange and the New York Stock Exchange. BMO's institution number is 001, and the SWIFT code is BOFMCAM2. BMO is the eighth largest bank in North America by assets, with $1.5 trillion, and serves 13 million customers globally.

In the United States, BMO does business as BMO Financial Group, where it has substantial operations in the Chicago area and elsewhere in the country, where it operates BMO Bank, N.A.. BMO Capital Markets is BMO's investment and corporate banking division, while the wealth management division is branded as BMO Nesbitt Burns. On 12 December 2021, the Bank of Montreal announced the strategic acquisition of Bank of the West from BNP Paribas for US$16.3 billion.

== History ==
=== 19th century ===
The bank was established on 23 June 1817 when a group of merchants signed the Articles of Association, formally creating the "Montreal Bank". The signors of the document include Robert Armour, John C. Bush, Austin Cuvillier, George Garden, Horatio Gates, James Leslie, George Moffatt, John Richardson, and Thomas A. Turner. The bank was first located in rooms rented on Rue Saint-Paul, Montreal, before moving to its permanent building on Rue Saint-Paul in 1818. In the same year, the bank opened its first branch in Quebec City; and several offices in Upper Canada, including Amherstburg, Kingston, Perth, and York (present day Toronto). The bank also opened its first foreign permanent office in 1818, opening an office in Willam Street in New York City.

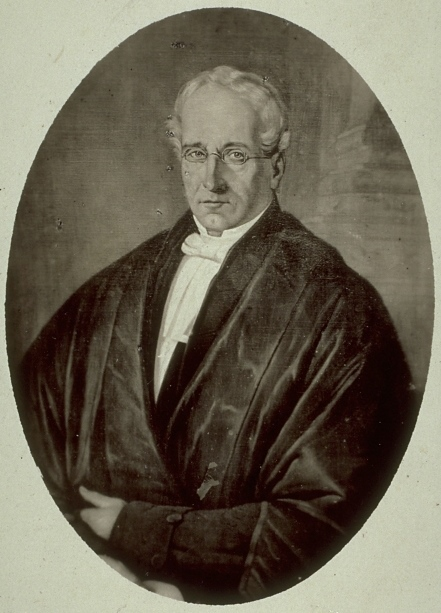
Austin Cuvillier co-founded BMO with nine other businessmen in June 1817.

By 1822, the bank converted from the status it had held since its founding as a private company owned by a small group of people into a public company owned by 144. At this time, it became officially known by its current name.

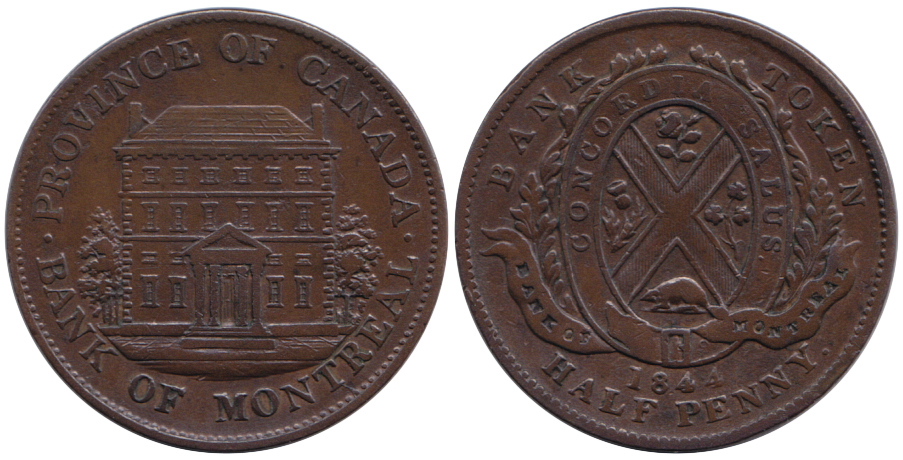
Bank of Montreal on an 1844 Province of Canada Token.

Expansion into Upper Canada was halted in 1824, after legislation from the Parliament of Upper Canada forbade bank branches whose head offices were not based in Upper Canada from operating. In 1838, the bank reentered the Upper Canadian market with the purchase of the Bank of the People, a bank based in Toronto. BMO was permitted to open its own branches in the area, after Upper Canada and Lower Canada were united to create the Province of Canada in 1841. Shortly after the two colonies merged, the bank opened branches into Cobourg, Belleville, Brockville, and Ottawa.

Expansion into the Maritimes and Western Canada was facilitated following Canadian Confederation. In 1877, the bank opened its first branch in Western Canada, with the opening of a branch in Winnipeg. New branches were also opened in the Maritimes, in Halifax, Moncton, and Saint John completed shortly after Confederation. The Bank of Montreal established branches in Newfoundland Colony on 31 January 1895, at the behest of the colonial government. The colonial government of Newfoundland made the request to the Bank of Montreal four days after the collapse of the Commercial Bank and Union Bank of Newfoundland on 10 December 1894.

=== 20th century ===
By 1907, the bank had branches in every province of Atlantic Canada, with the opening of a branch in Charlottetown. Expansion into the Maritimes was further facilitated with the acquisition of the Exchange Bank of Yarmouth in 1903, the People's Bank of Halifax in 1905, and the People's Bank of New Brunswick in 1906.

The early 20th century also saw the bank acquire several financial institutions that helped increase its presence in Newfoundland, and areas west of Quebec, including the Ontario Bank in 1906, the Bank of British North America in 1918, and the Merchants Bank of Canada in 1921. During this period, the bank also acquired the Montreal-based Molson Bank in 1925.

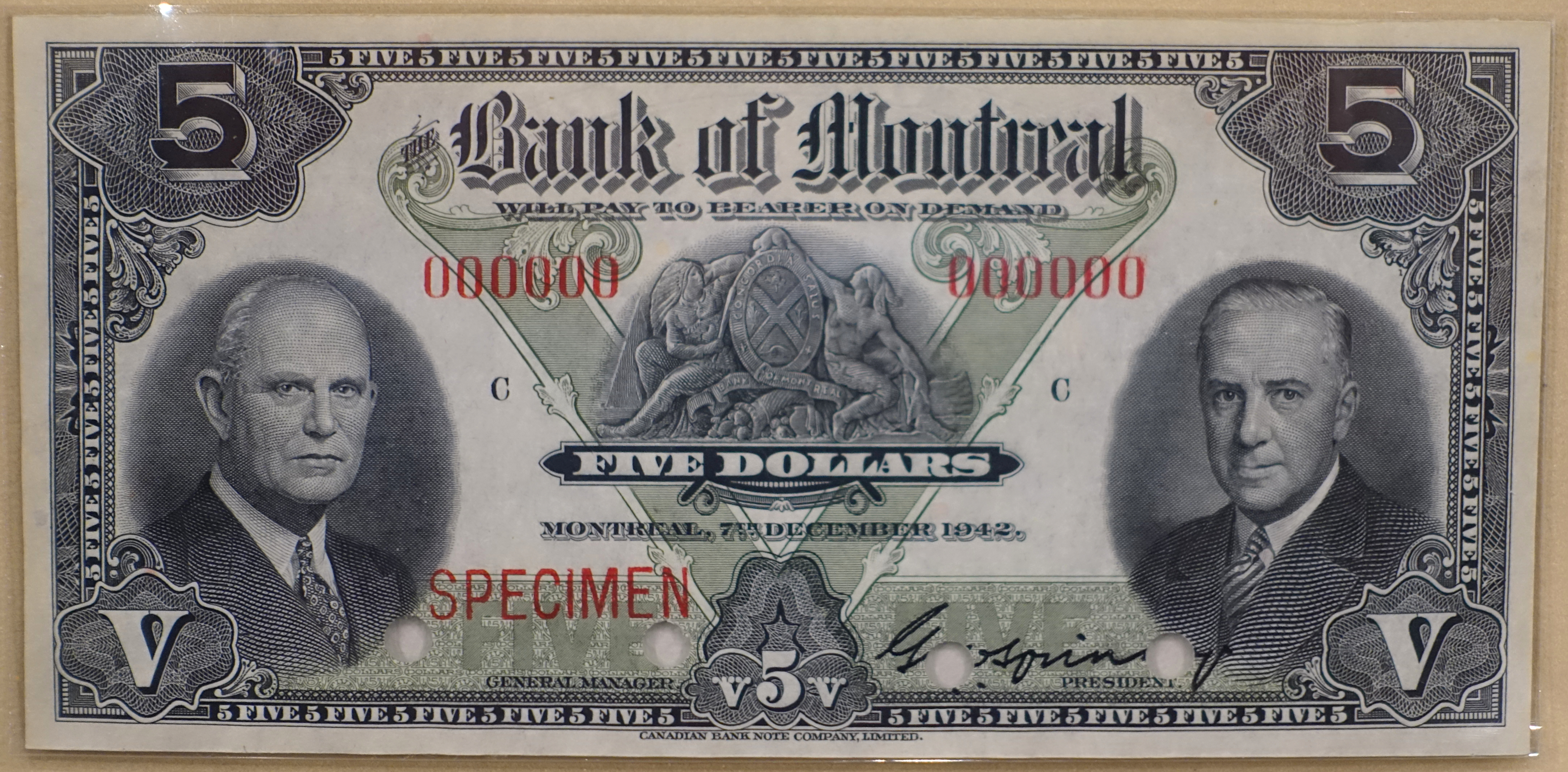
$5 BMO banknote, from 1942. The year was the last that the bank issued its own banknotes for circulation.

In 1942, the bank ended production of its own bank notes, which were in circulation in Canada since 1871. By 1944, the central bank of the country, the Bank of Canada became the sole issuer of currency in Canada, and notes from private banks were withdrawn.

In 1960, the Bank of Montreal moved its operational headquarters to a seventeen-storey structure next to its historic head office. The building served as the bank's operational headquarters until 1977, when it was moved to First Canadian Place on Bay Street in Toronto in 1977. The structure was named after the bank's slogan at the time, The First Canadian Bank, which was introduced in 1969, and was prominent in much of the bank's advertising during the 1970's, most notably in television commercials featuring Canadian actor Leslie Nielsen. The bank's present "M-Bar" logo was also introduced during this time, in 1967. However, the bank's legal headquarters remains at the historic Montreal head office, with First Canadian Place formally listed as the "executive office" of the bank.

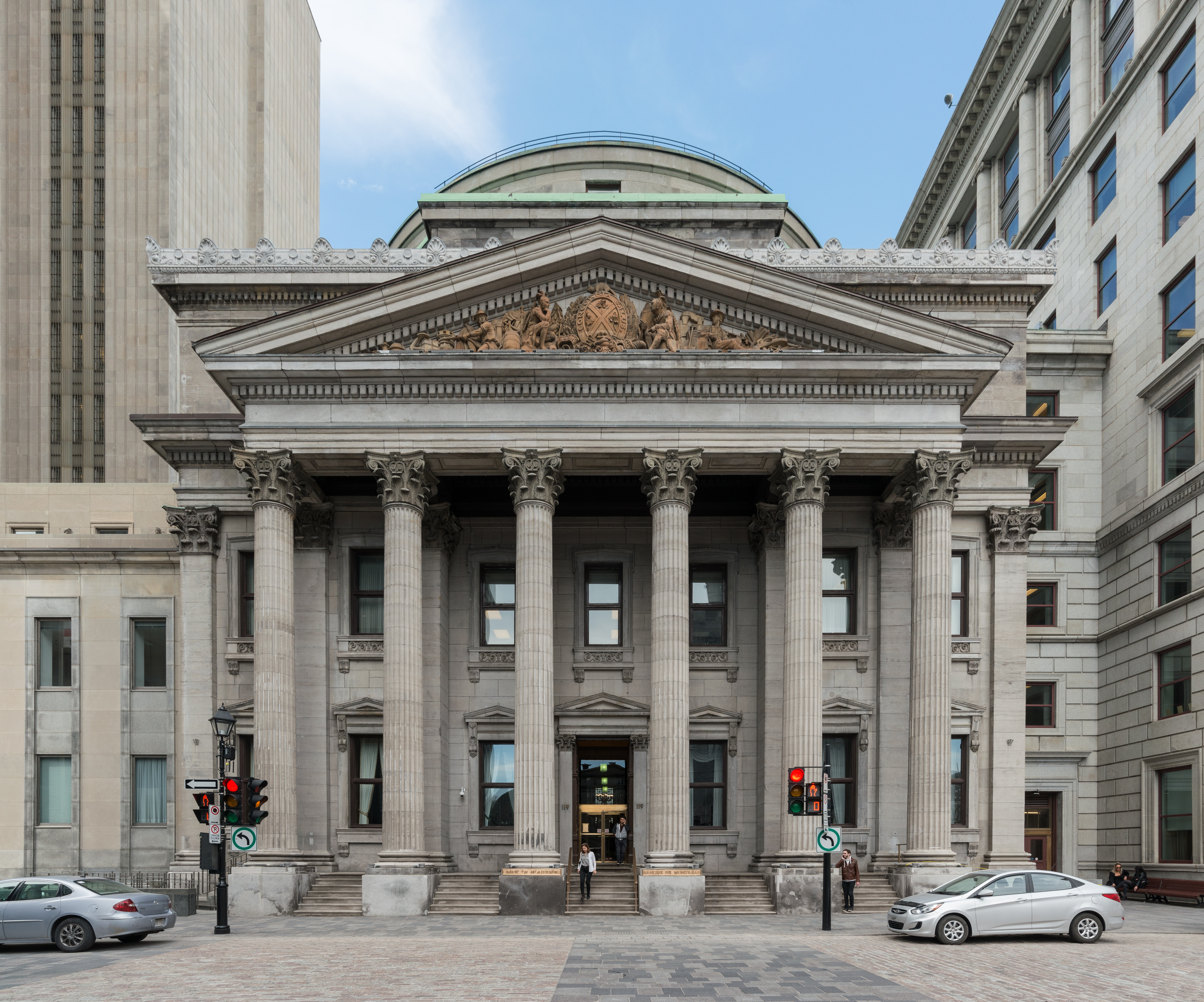
The original building at Place d'Armes in Montreal, Canada remains the bank's legal headquarters

In 1984, the bank acquired Chicago-based Harris Bank (through its parent, Harris Bankcorp), later rebranded as BMO Harris Bank. In 1987, the bank acquired stock brokerage Nesbitt, Thomson and Company. Several years later, the bank assumed control of two retail branches formerly belonging to the Standard Chartered Bank of Canada.

In 1994, the Bank of Montreal became the first Canadian bank to be listed on the New York Stock Exchange. In 1995, the bank opened its first branch in Guangzhou, formally receiving a license to operate the branch on 20 November 1996. In doing so the bank became the first Canadian bank to receive a license to operate in China. During the 1990s, BMO acquired a number of other banks in the Chicago area, merging them under the Harris Bank name, including Suburban Bancorp in 1994; and Household Bank in 1999.

In 1998, the Bank of Montreal and the Royal Bank of Canada announced they had agreed to a merger pending approval from the government. Government regulators later blocked the proposed merger, along with a similar proposal by the Toronto-Dominion Bank to merge with the Canadian Imperial Bank of Commerce. Although the banks did not merge, in 2000, the Bank of Montreal, together with the Royal Bank of Canada, merged their merchant payment processor businesses to form Moneris Solutions.

=== 21st century ===
In 2006, BMO bought BCPBank, a Schedule C financial institution that was the Canadian division of Banco Comercial Português. In 2008, a Bank of Montreal trader pleaded guilty to intentionally mismarking his trading book in order to increase his bonus from the bank.

In 2009, BMO purchased AIG's Canadian life insurance business, AIG Life Insurance Company of Canada (400,000 customers and 300 employees), for approximately CA$330 million, making BMO the second-biggest life insurer among Canadian banks. The new component was renamed BMO Life Assurance Company. In the same year, the Bank of Montreal acquired the Diners Club International's North American franchise from Citibank. The transaction gave BMO exclusive rights to issue Diners cards in the US and Canada.

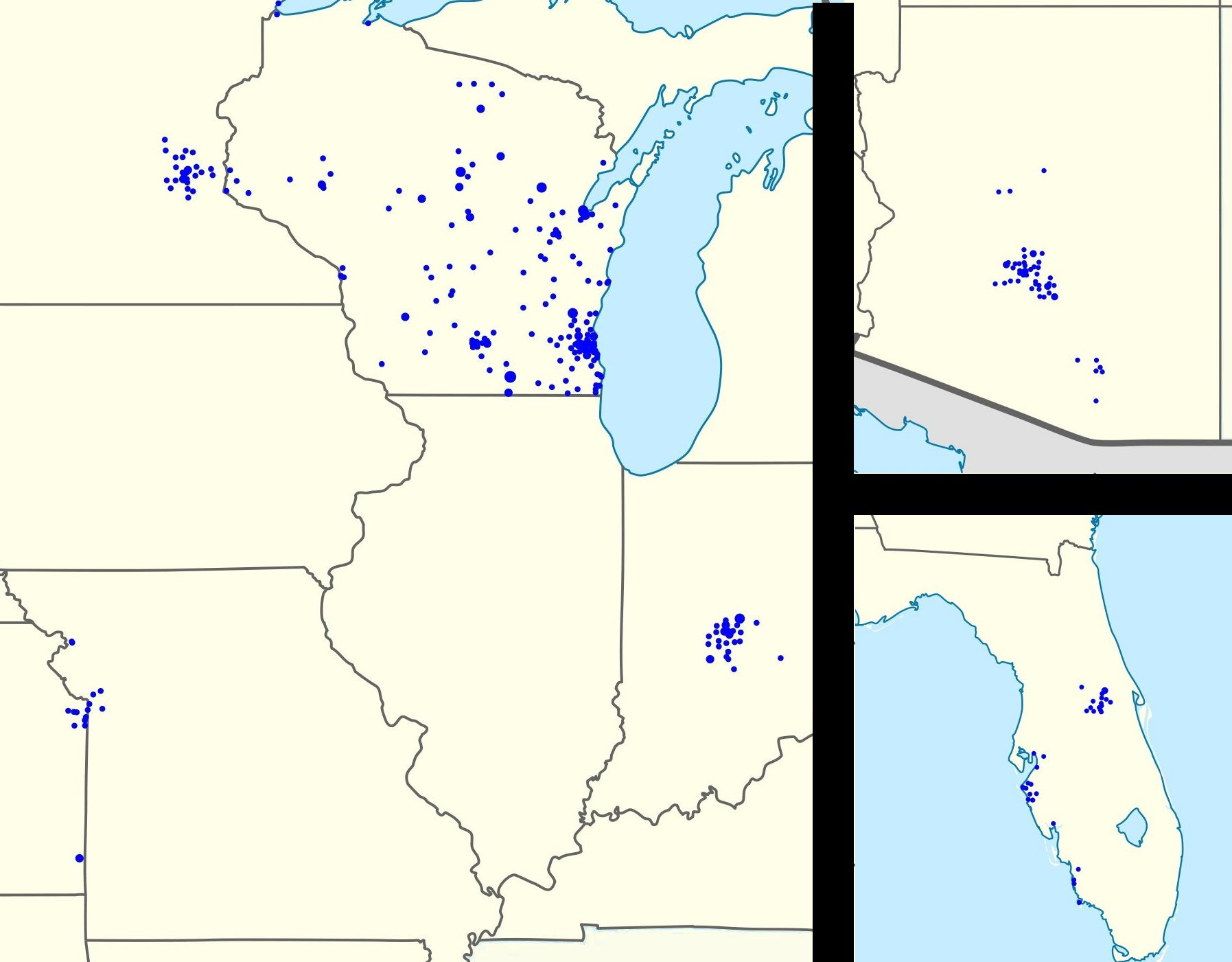
Footprint of Milwaukee-based bank Marshall & Ilsley prior to its acquisition by the Bank of Montreal in 2010.

In October 2010, the bank became the first Canadian bank to incorporate in China, with branches in China operating as BMO ChinaCo. In December 2010, BMO announced the purchase of Milwaukee-based Marshall & Ilsley, and was later amalgamated with its Harris Bank operations. When the transaction completed, M&I Bank, along with current Harris Bank branches were rebranded BMO Harris Bank. In 2022, BMO booked US$834 million after being found liable for Marshall & Ilsley Bank Ponzi scheme with damages of US$550 million. In 2009, businessman Thomas Petters was found guilty of running the scheme using an account at Marshall & Ilsley between 2002 and 2008. When BMO bought Marshall & Ilsley and assumed the liability. In 2014, the bank acquired London-based Foreign & Colonial Investment Trust, later re-branding it as BMO Commercial Property Trust in 2019. In September 2015, BMO agreed to acquire General Electric Co. subsidiary GE Capital's transportation-finance unit. The business acquired has US$8.7 billion (CA$11.5 billion) of assets, 600 employees and 15 offices in the US and Canada.

BMO and Simplii Financial (a subsidiary of the Canadian Imperial Bank of Commerce) were the targets of hackers in May 2018, who claimed to have compromised the systems of both banks and stolen information on a combined 90,000 customers (50,000 from BMO). An email sent from a Russian address and attributed to the hackers demanded a ransom of US$1 million from each company paid via Ripple by 11:59 pm on 28 May 2018 or the information would be released on "fraud forum [sic] and fraud community [sic]".

In 2018, BMO went into the marijuana sector with a $175 million deal for a stake in a producer. It was the first investment in the sector by a "Big Five Canadian bank". In January 2018, the bank was accused in a lawsuit along with five other Canadian banks for "conspiring to rig a Canadian rate benchmark to improve profits from derivatives trading".

After resigning from the Canadian Liberal cabinet, Scott Brison was hired by the bank as its vice-chair of investment and corporate banking in February 2019. In February 2019, it became reported that its US retail profits had surged. The bank moved its New York City headquarters in April 2019, to a former Conde Nast building. That month, the bank's Irish subsidiary was fined several million for a license breach. To settle charges by the SEC that it hid conflicts of interest from clients in 2016, in September 2019 the Bank of Montreal's two units in Chicago paid $38 million. In December 2019, the bank cut 2,300 jobs, after a drop in quarterly earnings, effecting around five percent of the workforce.

The company had plans to "double indigenous lending" in September 2019. There was controversy and protests in January 2020 after a12-year-old First Nations girl and her grandfather were handcuffed by police at a Vancouver branch of the bank following an identification discrepancy. The Vancouver mayor criticized the bank for what he termed giving false information to the police. The police were afterwards investigated. A human rights claim was later filed in response to the incident. A settlement was eventually reached, which included an undisclosed monetary payment to the victims, an apology ceremony in Bella Bella, territorial acknowledgement plaques installed at certain branches and BMO updating internal policies and procedures for how status cards are handled. After the incident, BMO launched an Indigenous Advisory Council with Indigenous members from a number of provinces.

The CEO of the bank argued against fossil fuel divestment in March 2020, after it "acquired $3 billion of energy loans from Deutsche Bank DBKGn.DE in 2018". In 2021, BMO signed the UN Principles for Responsible Banking (PRB) with the goal to reach global net-zero climate targets as well as net-zero financed emissions in their lending by 2050. In July 2022, BMO acquired Calgary-based Radicle Group Inc., an adviser to companies on sustainability and measuring carbon emissions.

In December 2021, BMO agreed to acquire San Francisco-based Bank of the West from BNP Paribas, with the intent of merging it with BMO Harris Bank, which would at least double BMO's total presence in the United States. BMO's acquisition of Bank of the West was completed in February 2023, and the Bank of the West brand is planned to be absorbed into the BMO brand by September 2023.

In January 2024, BMO became the first new member of the club of United Kingdom Bond dealers in 10 years, becoming one of the primary-dealer banks that buy bonds directly from the government. By buying bonds directly from the government, banks help create a liquid market for government debt, but they also have to hold additional capital as insurance against possible losses. In 2013, the number of primary bond dealers reached 21, by 2024 it had dropped to 16.

== Corporate information ==
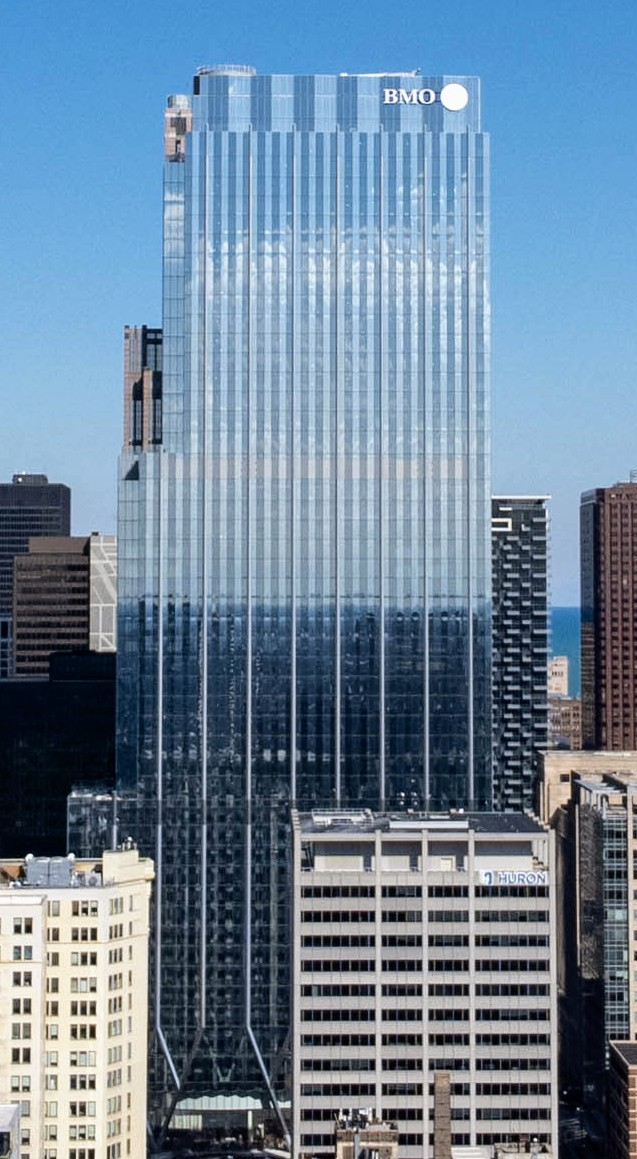
The head office for BMO USA, a Chicago-based subsidiary of BMO.

=== Operations ===
BMO is divided into three "client groups" which serve different markets. Each of the client groups operates under multiple brand names.

- Personal and Commercial Client Group (retail banking), including
  - BMO Bank of Montreal (commercial and retail banking in Canada), including BMO's MasterCard credit cards; BMO Life, a life insurance company; and the former virtual bank division mbanx
  - BMO Bank, N.A. (commercial and retail banking in the United States, headquartered in Chicago)
- Investment Banking Group (known as BMO Capital Markets)
- Private Client Group (wealth management), including
  - BMO Nesbitt Burns (full service investing in Canada): formed following 1987 acquisition of Nesbitt Thomson, then one of Canada's oldest investment houses, and the 1994 acquisition of Burns Fry, a dealer of Canadian equities and debt securities. Nesbitt Thomson and Burns Fry then merged to become BMO Nesbitt Burns.
  - BMO InvestorLine (self-service investing in Canada)
  - BMO Harris Investor Services (advisory services in the United States)
  - BMO Private Banking (private banking in Canada and the United States) including Harris myCFO and Cedar Street Advisors (both affiliates of BMO Harris Bank) In 2014–2015 BMO rebranded BMO Harris Private Bank as BMO Private Bank.

In October 2008, Mediacorp Canada Inc. named BMO Financial Group one of Greater Toronto's Top Employers.

== Notable buildings ==
=== Historic branches ===
A number of buildings in which Bank of Montreal presently operates branches have been designated by municipal, provincial, and/or federal levels of government as being of historic importance. These include:

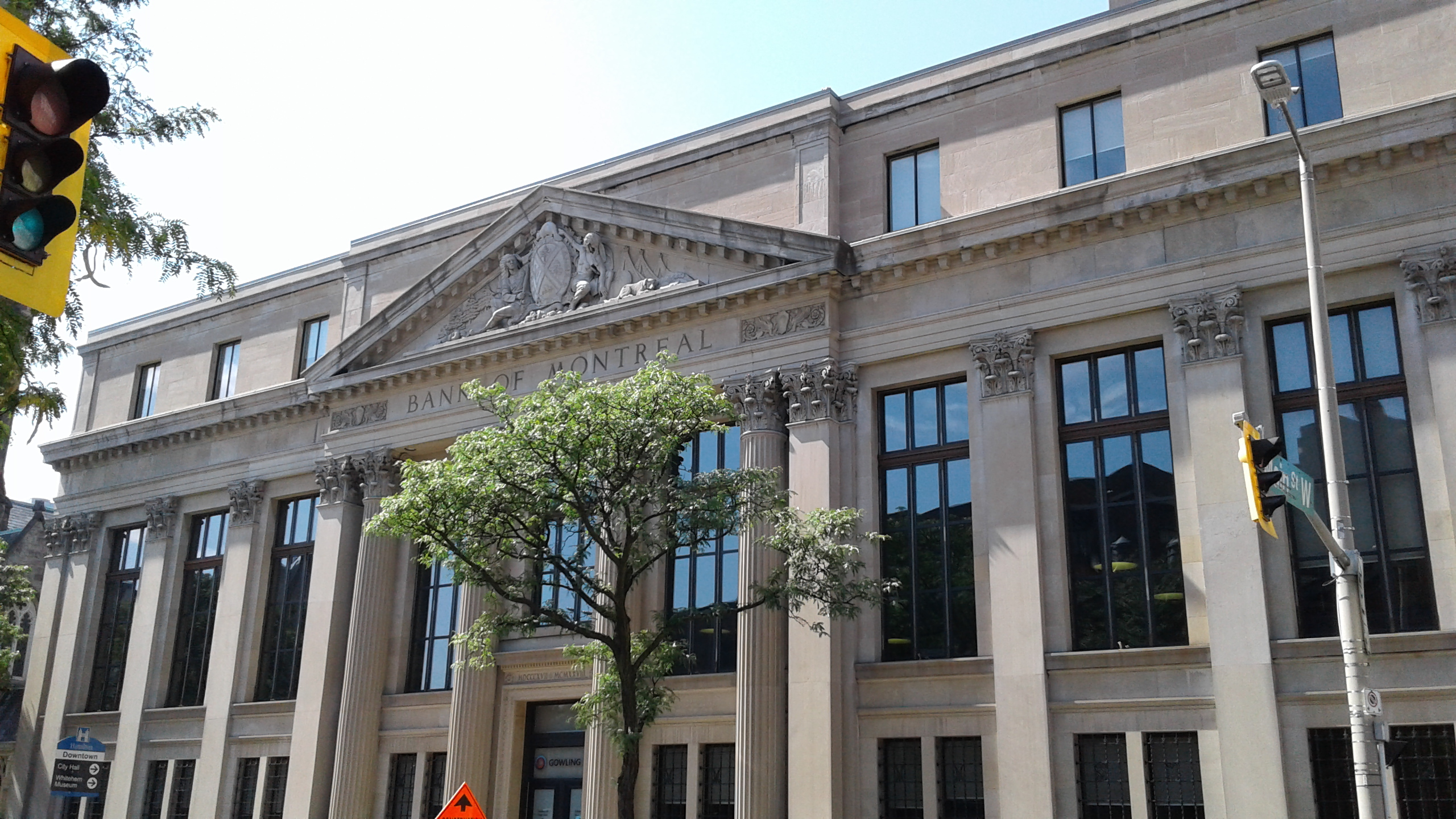
A Bank of Montreal branch in Hamilton. Erected in 1928, the building is presently recognized under the Ontario Heritage Act.

- The Bank of Montreal, 4896 Delta Street, Delta, British Columbia (1919)
- The Bank of Montreal, 511 Columbia Street, New Westminster, British Columbia (1947–1948)
- The Bank of Montreal, 322 Curling Street, Corner Brook, Newfoundland and Labrador (1915)
- The Bank of Montreal, 426 Portage Avenue, Winnipeg, Manitoba (1927)
- The "Old Bank of Montreal", 100 Victoria Street East, Amherst, Nova Scotia (1906)
- The Bank of Montreal, 1 Main Street West, Hamilton, Ontario (1928)
- The Bank of Montreal, 144 Wellington Street, Ottawa, Ontario built by Ernest Barott of Barott and Blackader, architects, of Montreal
- The Bank of Montreal, 3 King Street, Waterloo, Ontario, formerly known as the Molson's Bank, by architect Andrew Taylor (1914)

A number of late-19th century Bank of Montreal branches were also built by British architect, Andrew Taylor. Taylor designed a three-storey structure for the Bank of Montreal on Saint Jacques Street in Montreal. The building was modelled after a Georgian townhouse with a small portico of Corinthian columns supporting a classical pediment and remains the bank's legal headquarters.

- The Bank of Montreal in West End, Ste. Catherine Street West at Mansfield Street, Montreal (1889)
- The Bank of Montreal in Notre Dame Street West Seigneurs Street, Montreal (1894)
- The Bank of Montreal in Point St. Charles Branch, Wellington Street at Magdalen Street, Montreal (1901)
- The Bank of Montreal, St. Catherine Street West at Papineau Street, Montreal (1904)
- The Bank of Montreal, Perth, Ontario (1884)
- The Bank of Montreal, Calgary, Alberta, Stephen Avenue at Scarth Street [now 1 Street SW] (1888)
- Manager's residence for the Bank of Montreal, Grande Allée, Quebec City, Quebec (1904)
- The Bank of Montreal in Sydney, Nova Scotia; designated by The Cape Breton Regional Municipality as a registered heritage property in 2008, (1901)

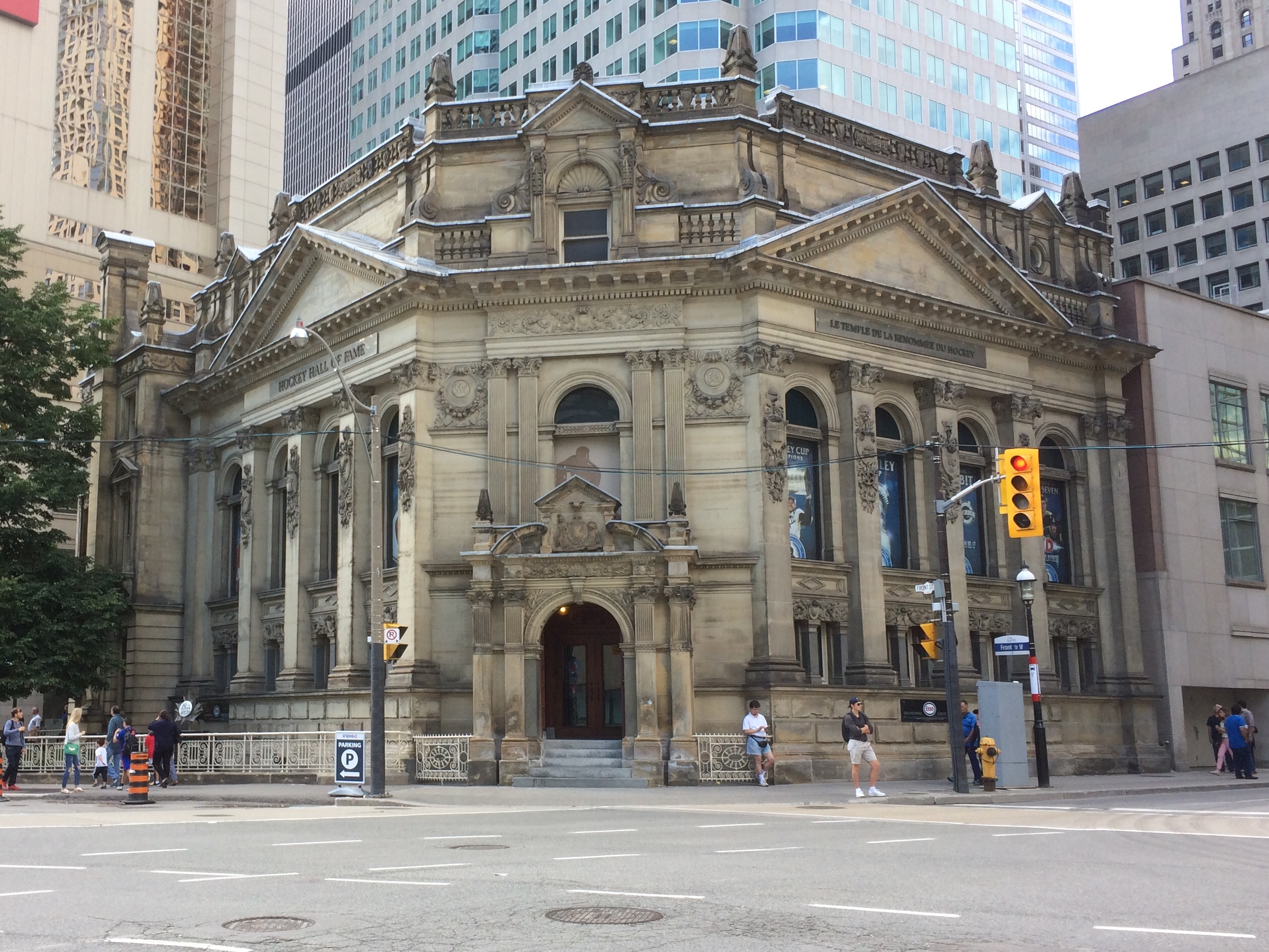
A former BMO branch on Front and Yonge Street, now houses the Hockey Hall of Fame.

Buildings that formerly housed a branch of the bank have also seen later notable use. A branch in Montreal has been designated as a National Historic Site of Canada in 1990. The building was completed in 1894, and was designated as a historic site as a good example of Queen Anne Revival architecture. Another former Bank of Montreal branch on Front and Yonge Streets in Toronto has housed the Hockey Hall of Fame since 1993. The 1885 Beaux-Arts styled building designed by the Toronto firm of Darling & Curry.

=== Headquarters ===
Completed in 1847, the Bank of Montreal Head Office is formally located in Montreal, on Saint Jacques Street. However in 1960, the operational headquarters was moved to a 17-storey tower adjacent the historic head office building. In 1977, the bank's operational headquarters or "executive office", was moved to First Canadian Place in Toronto, with the chairman, president, and some senior executives working from First Canadian Place. The structure's was named after a historic slogan of the bank, the First Canadian Bank, a slogan introduced in 1969.

== Sponsorships ==
The bank is a founder and major sponsor of the Siminovitch Prize in Theatre, an annual award of $100,000 granted to a Canadian director, playwright, or designer.

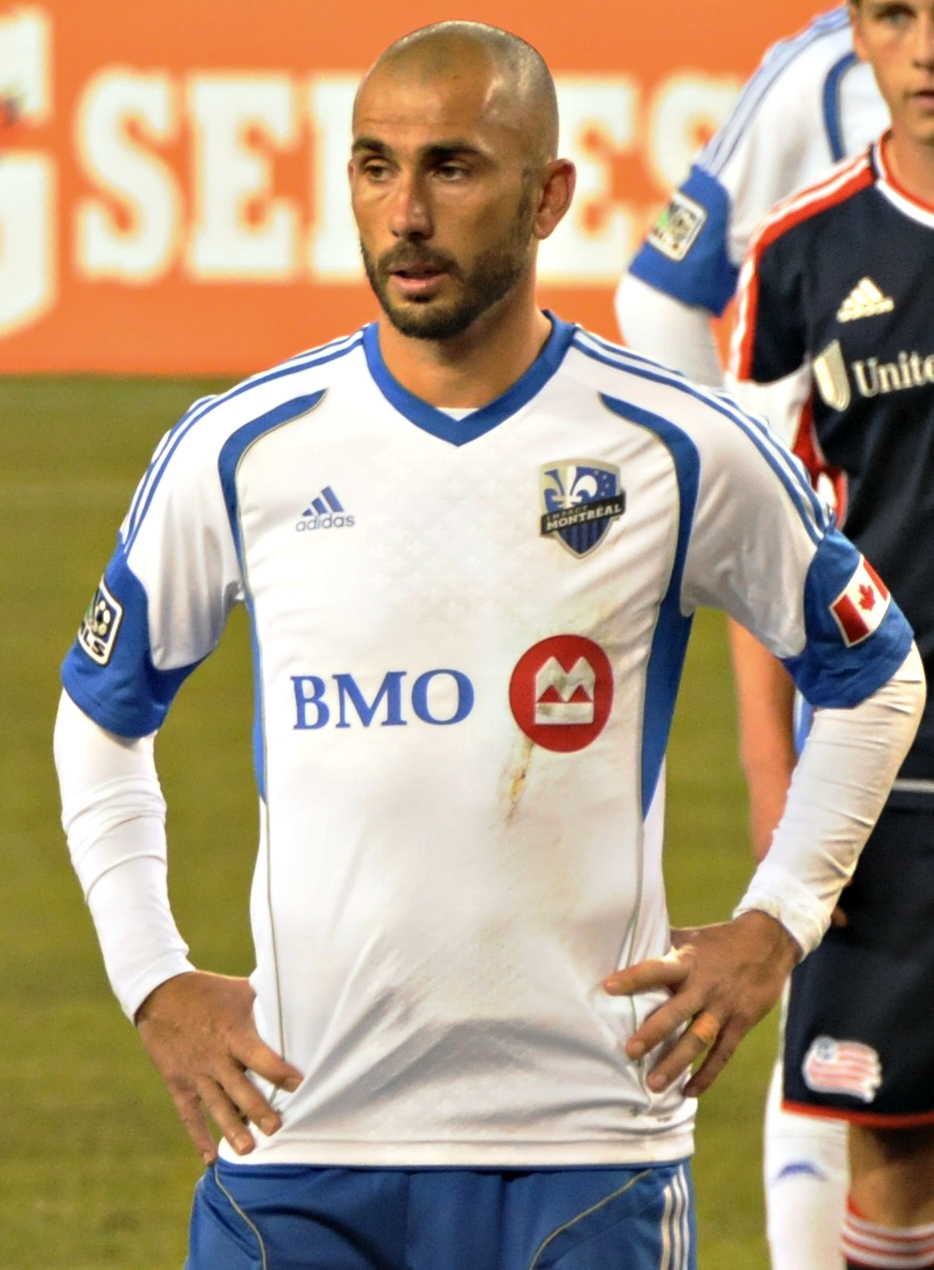
The bank has been the jersey sponsor for MLS's CF Montréal since 2012.

The bank has been a sponsor of the Toronto FC of Major League Soccer since 2007 and of its home stadium named BMO Field at Exhibition Place. In 2010, BMO extended its agreement with the Toronto FC through the 2016 season. The bank is also a sponsor of the CF Montréal, announcing a five-year agreement to become lead sponsor and jersey sponsor on 14 June 2011. In addition, the bank is a sponsor of Los Angeles FC, with their stadium being named BMO Stadium since 2023.

From at least 2007 through 2011, BMO was the sponsor for the Toronto Maple Leafs and the Toronto Raptors. In July 2008, BMO announced a one-year sponsorship of IndyCar team Newman/Haas/Lanigan Racing to appear on the No. 06 car of Graham Rahal in the first-ever IRL-sanctioned Canadian IndyCar race at Edmonton.

Since 1997, Bank of Montreal has been a major sponsor of Skate Canada, and is the title sponsor of the BMO Financial Group Canadian Championships, BMO Financial Group Skate Canada Junior Nationals, BMO Financial Group Skate Canada Challenges, BMO Financial Group Skate Canada Sectionals, and BMO Financial Group Skate Canada Synchronized Championships. It is also the presenting sponsor of the CanSkate Learn-to-Skate Program.

In 2005, BMO Bank of Montreal became the title sponsor for the annual May marathon race staged by the Vancouver International Marathon Society. The current name is "BMO Bank of Montreal Vancouver Marathon".

In 2025, Bank of Montreal became a major sponsor of the Northern Super League, the top women's soccer league in Canada.

== Membership ==
BMO is a member of the Canadian Bankers Association and registered member with the Canada Deposit Insurance Corporation, a federal agency insuring deposits at all of Canada's chartered banks. It is also a member of:

- Air Miles
- ATM Industry Association
- Interac
- Cirrus for MasterCard card users
- Diners Club North America
- MasterCard International

BMO Bank (BMO's US operations) is a member of the Federal Reserve System and a registered member of the Federal Deposit Insurance Corporation. It is also a member of:

- Cirrus for MasterCard card users
- Diners Club North America
- Interlink for Visa card users
- NYCE for MasterCard card users
- MasterCard International
- Plus for Visa card users
- Visa

== Leadership ==
=== President ===
1. John Gray, 1817–1820
2. Samuel Gerrard, 1820–1826
3. Horatio Gates, 1826
4. John Molson, 1826–1834
5. Peter McGill, 1834–1860
6. Thomas Brown Anderson, 1860–1869
7. Edwin Henry King, 1869–1873
8. David Torrance, 1873–1876
9. The Lord Mount Stephen, 1876–1881
10. Charles Francis Smithers, 1881–1887
11. The Lord Strathcona, 1887–1905
12. Sir George Alexander Drummond, 1905–1910
13. Richard Bladworth Angus, 1910–1913
14. Sir Henry Vincent Meredith, 1913–1927
15. Sir Charles Blair Gordon, 1927–1939
16. Huntly Redpath Drummond, 1939–1942
17. George Wilbur Spinney, 1942–1948
18. Bertie Charles Gardner, 1948–1952
19. Gordon Reginald Ball, 1952–1959
20. George Arnold Reeve Hart, 1959 – 30 April 1967
21. Robert David Mulholland, 1 May 1967 – December 1968
22. John Leonard Walker, December 1968 – 3 February 1973
23. Frederick Harold McNeil, February 1973 – 31 December 1974
24. William David Mulholland, 1 January 1975 – 30 June 1981
25. William Elwood Bradford, 1 July 1981 – 31 October 1983
26. Grant Louis Reuber, 1 November 1983 – 30 October 1987
27. Matthew William Barrett, 1 November 1987 – 16 January 1990
28. Francis Anthony Comper, 16 January 1990 – 31 October 1999
  Separate divisional presidents, 1 November 1999 – 30 April 2004
29. Francis Anthony Comper, 1 May 2004 – 28 February 2007
30. William Arthur Downe, 1 March 2007 – 31 October 2013
  Office abolished 1 November 2013

=== Chairman of the Board ===
1. Sir Henry Vincent Meredith, 1927–1929
2. Huntly Redpath Drummond, 1942–1946
3. Bertie Charles Gardner, 1952–1954
4. Arthur Christian Jensen, 1959 – 7 December 1964
5. George Arnold Reeve Hart, 7 December 1964 – December 1975
6. Frederick Harold McNeil, December 1975 – 30 June 1981
7. William David Mulholland, 1 July 1981 – 15 January 1990
8. Matthew William Barrett, 15 January 1990 – 30 October 1999
9. Francis Anthony Comper, 1 November 1999 – 30 April 2004
10. David Alexander Galloway, 1 May 2004 – 20 March 2012
11. John Robert Stobo Prichard, 20 March 2012 – 31 May 2020
12. George Alexander Cope, 31 May 2020 – present

=== Chief Executive Officer ===
1. George Arnold Reeve Hart, 1959 – December 1971
2. John Leonard Walker, December 1971 – December 1972
3. George Arnold Reeve Hart, December 1972 – 31 December 1974
4. Frederick Harold McNeil, 1 January 1975 – January 1979
5. William David Mulholland, January 1979 – 30 June 1989
6. Matthew William Barrett, 1 July 1989 – 23 February 1999
7. Francis Anthony Comper, 23 February 1999 – 28 February 2007
8. William Arthur Downe, 1 March 2007 – 31 October 2017
9. William Darryl White, 1 November 2017 – present

== See also ==
- BMO SmartFolio
- List of banks and credit unions in Canada
- List of banks in the Americas
- List of largest banks
