= The Journal of Wealth Management =

- Discipline: Finance, investment
- Language: English

Publication details
- Former name(s): The Journal of Private Portfolio Management
- History: 1998–present
- Publisher: Portfolio Management Research
- Frequency: Quarterly

Standard abbreviations
- ISO 4: J. Wealth Manag.

Indexing
- ISSN: 1520-4154
- LCCN: 2001211629
- OCLC no.: 45875539

Links
- Journal homepage

The Journal of Wealth Management is a quarterly academic journal covering the management of high-net-worth taxable portfolios. Articles offer practical investment strategies in private wealth management, commentary on estate and financial planning, research on goals-based investing, behavioral finance and family office management. Called the Journal of Private Portfolio Management in its first two years of publication, the journal changed its name to reflect its broader focus on a range of wealth management issues beyond portfolio management that are relevant to high-net-worth investors. The editor-in-chief is Jean L.P. Brunel (Brunel Associates).
