= Fighting Antisemitism Together =

Canadian human rights activist group

Fighting Antisemitism Together (FAST) was a Canadian human rights group founded in 2005 that described itself as "a coalition of non-Jewish Canadian community and business leaders dedicated to speaking out against humanity's oldest hatred."

FAST was founded by Elizabeth and Tony Comper, former CEO and President of BMO Financial. The organization was unique in that its leadership was not Jewish. In 2021, FAST merged into the Canadian Institute for the Study of Antisemitism (CISA), a scholarly organization that publishes the academic journal Antisemitism Studies.
