= William D. Mulholland =

American banker (1926–2007)

- Born: June 16, 1926; Albany, New York
- Died: September 8, 2007 (aged 81); Georgetown, Ontario
- Education: Christian Brothers Academy ('44); Harvard University (AB '50, MBA '52)
- Spouse: Nancy Louise Booth (m. 1957)
- Military career
- Branch: United States Army
- Service years: 1944–1946
- Unit: 342d Infantry Regiment
- Conflicts: World War II; Philippines campaign

William David Mulholland Jr. (June 16, 1926 – September 8, 2007) was an American banker who served as president, chairman, and chief executive officer of the Bank of Montreal. Mulholland began his career in 1952 with Morgan Stanley, and in 1962 was made a partner in the firm. Whilst a partner at Morgan Stanley in the 1960s, he arranged the financing for the construction of the Churchill Falls Generating Station by Brinco. In late 1969, Brinco's executive plane crashed, killing several of the company's officers, including the president. In the aftermath, the board hired Mulholland as president, at which time he moved to Montreal.

Mulholland presided over Brinco for five years and oversaw the completion of the generating station. In November 1974, Mulholland was appointed president of the Bank of Montreal, effective January 1, 1975. Mulholland was given the additional title of chief executive officer in January 1979, and in July 1981 ceded the presidency to become chairman of the board. He remained chief executive until July 1989, and retired as chairman at the bank's annual meeting in January 1990. Mulholland died on September 8, 2007, at age 81.

== Biography ==
=== Early life and education ===
Mulholland Jr. was born on June 16, 1926, in Albany, New York to William David Mulholland Sr. (1899–1983) and Helen Elizabeth Flack (1899–1980), and was of Irish Catholic origin. He was educated at Christian Brothers Academy in Albany, a Catholic military academy, where he graduated in 1944. That year, Mulholland received a commission in the United States Army, and trained at Fort Benning to become a weapons instructor. Towards the end of the war, he was posted to the Philippines as a company commander in the 342d Infantry Regiment, 86th Infantry Division. Following the end of the Philippines campaign, Mulholland and his company helped to helped to form a Philippine constabulary force to fight communist guerillas. Mulholland was decommissioned in 1946, and in February 1947 enrolled at Harvard University. He graduated Bachelor of Arts in 1950, then received a master of business administration from the Harvard Business School in 1952.

=== Career ===
Whilst a student at Harvard Business School, Mulholland met Henry Sturgis Morgan, the grandson of J. Pierpont Morgan. The meeting led to an invitation to join the Morgan Stanley firm. Mulholland began his career in 1952 as a staff member of Morgan Stanley in New York. In 1962, he was made a partner in the firm. Beginning in 1958, Mulholland had worked with the British Newfoundland Corporation (Brinco), and was involved in the financing of the Twin Falls Generating Station. As part of his work with the company, he was elected a director both of Brinco and its subsidiary, the Churchill Falls (Labrador) Corporation Limited. Mulholland was principally responsible for Brinco's issue of US$500 million in bonds to finance the construction of the Churchill Falls Generating Station. During the 1960s the Mulhollands lived on Tower Hill Road in the prestigious village of Tuxedo Park.

In 1968, the Hudson Institute, of which Mulholland was a trustee, sent him to Vietnam to tour the country for two weeks and evaluate the prospect of raising a similar force to the one he had established in Vietnam in 1945.

On November 11, 1969, Brinco's de Havilland DH-125 crashed while attempting to land in Labrador City, killing six of the company's executives, including president Donald J. McParland and vice-president of finance Eric G. Lambert. Due to his close association with the company over the preceding decade, in December 1969 Brinco's board appointed Mulholland as president, effective January 1, 1970. Before Christmas 1969, the Mulhollands relocated to Montreal, where Brinco was headquartered. The family acquired the Ross Huntington McMaster House at 1296 Redpath Crescent.

By 1974, the Churchill Fall Generating Station was fully operational. At some point in the early 1970s, Mulholland had been elected a director of the Bank of Montreal. In November 1974, Mulholland was appointed by the Bank of Montreal as its new president, succeeding Frederick Harold McNeil, who became deputy chairman and chief executive officer. In his first years as president, he oversaw the creation of a multi-branch banking system, the introduction of daily interest savings accounts, and the transition from print to digital ledgers. In January 1979 he succeeded McNeil as chief executive officer, then on July 1, 1981, succeeded McNeil as chairman of the board. At this time, Mulholland ceded the presidency to William Elwood Bradford. As chairman and chief executive, Mulholland saw the bank through the early 1980s recession. He figured prominently in the 1984 National Film Board documentary Prisoners of Debt: Inside the Global Banking Crisis. In January 1980, he coordinated the $1.25 billion refinancing of Hydro-Québec, managed the $3 billion loan to Joseph E. Seagram & Sons that same year, and financed the $1.4 billion North West Shelf Venture. In 1984, he negotiated the purchase of the Harris Bankcorp of Chicago. After amendments to the Bank Act allowed banks to acquire securities dealers, Mulholland arranged the Bank of Montreal's purchase of a 75 per cent stake in Nesbitt, Thomson and Company.

In January 1989, Mulholland announced his retirement. Effective July 1, 1989, he would hand the title of chief executive officer to Matthew William Barrett, and at the bank's annual meeting in January 1990, he would retire as chairman, with Barrett filling that post also. In retirement, Mulholland and his wife built Windswept Farm, a Hanoverian stud farm, near Georgetown, Ontario.

=== Other activities ===
Mulholland was a member of the Sierra Club, National Audubon Society, Metropolitan Club, Mount Royal Club, Forest and Stream Club, Lake of Two Mountains Hunt Club, Canadian Club of Montreal, and City Midday Club. He served as a director of Rio Tinto–Zinc Corporation, Rio Algom Mines, Standard Life (Canada), Hudson Institute, Iskut Pulpower, Kimberly–Clark, Upjohn, and Canadian Pacific. Mulholland received honorary doctorates from Memorial University in 1972 and Queen's University in 1988, and received the Israeli Prime Minister's Medal in 1987 and the Order of Merit of the Federal Republic of Germany in 1989.

=== Personal life ===
On June 22, 1957, Mulholland married Nancy Louise Booth. They had nine children: William III, Charles, James, John, Elizabeth, Madeline, Sarah, Caroline, and Bruce. Bill Mulholland died at home on September 8, 2007, at age 81. A funeral mass was held on September 12 at Holy Cross Church in Georgetown, and he was interred in the United States with full military honors.

== Works ==
- Mulholland, W. D. From the Chairman: Selected Speeches 1980–1989. Bank of Montreal, 1990.
