= F. Anthony Comper =

Canadian banker (born 1945)

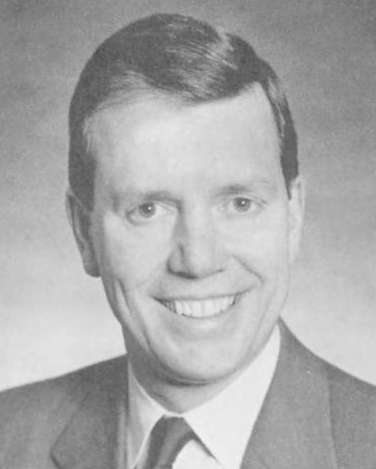

Chair of the University of Toronto Governing Council
- In office 1995–1998
- Preceded by: Annamarie P. Castrilli
- Succeeded by: Wendy M. Cecil

Vice-Chair of the University of Toronto Governing Council
- In office 1993–1995
- Preceded by: Annamarie P. Castrilli
- Succeeded by: Wendy M. Cecil

Personal details
- Born: 24 April 1945 (age 81) Toronto, Ontario
- Spouse: Elizabeth Webster (m. 1971)
- Education: University of Toronto (BA 1966)

Francis Anthony Comper CM (born 24 April 1945) is a Canadian retired banker who served as the president, chairman of the board, and chief executive officer of the Bank of Montreal.

== Early life ==
Comper attended De La Salle College and received a BA in English from St. Michael's College, Toronto, in 1966.

== Banking ==
Comper joined the Bank of Montreal as a management trainee after college. In 1990, he became president and chief operating officer. As president, he led The Task Force on the Advancement of Women in the Bank. Today, no fewer than 40 per cent of senior roles at BMO are held by women.

He was promoted to chairman and chief executive officer in 1999 after the departure of Matthew Barrett. As part of a corporate governance trend in 2004, he gave up the title of chairman of the board in favor of a non-management director. He has spent four decades at BMO.

Comper more than doubled BMO's market cap, to almost $35 billion by the end of fiscal 2006, in an eight-year tenure capped by last year's record profit of $2.7 billion. Comper also managed to sidestep Enron Corp. and other potholes that his peers at some of the other Canadian banks stepped into.

In 2020, his memoir, Personal Account: 25 Tales About Leadership, Learning, and Legacy from a Lifetime at Bank of Montreal, was published by ECW Press. In the book, he argues that prudent risk management has long been a hallmark of Canadian banking that sets it apart from many other jurisdictions.

Comper has been criticized in the past for his high salary and bonus which, according to some observers, is out of proportion to his value as a president of a fairly standard banking operation. He made $11 million in 2003. His policy of "service shrinkage", or decreasing the number of services offered for the same banking fee, has attracted criticism from customers. In 2006, on his watch, BMO was forced to refund overcharges on mortgage payments of approximately $250 per customer.

Comper stepped down on March 1, 2007, at BMO's annual meeting, but stayed on as an adviser until April 24, his 62nd birthday. This announcement came at the same time as BMO posted disappointing fourth quarter results, though they were record profits for the bank due to lower taxes and bad loans. He was succeeded by Bill Downe, who had been the frontrunner for the CEO position for the last few years, and formerly chief operating officer of BMO.

== Philanthropy ==
Comper served as chairman of the University of Toronto's fundraising program Campaign for the University of Toronto (1995–2004), as chairperson of the University of Toronto's Governing Council (circa 1995–1998) and as vice-chair of St. Michael's Hospital in Toronto.

Together with his wife Elizabeth, Comper founded FAST – Fighting Antisemitism Together, a Canadian group which opposes anti-Semitism and which describes itself as "a coalition of non-Jewish Canadian community and business leaders dedicated to speaking out against humanity's oldest hatred."

In 2010, Comper was made a Member of the Order of Canada, along with his wife Elizabeth (1945–2014), "for their commitment to the community at large as active volunteers and philanthropists".

He received the Human Relations Award from the Canadian Council of Christians and Jews and the Award of Merit from B'nai B'rith Canada. He holds four honorary degrees from the University of Toronto (LL.D.), Mount Saint Vincent University (D.Hum.L.), the University of New Brunswick (D.Litt.); and University of Haifa. Tony, and his late wife, Elizabeth, also received the Scopus Award from the Hebrew University of Jerusalem. In November 2009, Concordia University conferred the degree of Doctor of Philosophy (honoris causa) on Tony and Elizabeth.

In 2020, Comper's FAST (Fighting Antisemitism Together) joined forces with the Canadian Institute for the Study of Antisemitism.

In retirement, he has continued to speak out against intolerance.

== Notes ==
Business positions
Preceded by Matthew Barrett	President of the Bank of Montreal; 1990-March 1, 1999	Succeeded by
Preceded by	CEO of the Bank of Montreal; 1999-March 1, 2007	Succeeded by Bill Downe
