= Bill Downe =

Canadian banker

- Born: William Arthur Downe; 1952 (age 73–74); Montreal, Quebec, Canada
- Education: Wilfrid Laurier University (BA); University of Toronto (MBA)
- Occupation: Banker
- Title: former CEO, Bank of Montreal
- Term: March 2007 – October 2017
- Predecessor: Tony Comper
- Successor: Darryl White

William Arthur Downe CM (born 1952) is a Canadian banker who was chief executive officer (CEO) of Bank of Montreal (also known as BMO Financial Group) from 2007 to 2017.

== Early life ==
Downe earned a bachelor's degree from Wilfrid Laurier University. He later obtained a Master of Business Administration from the University of Toronto.

In 2003, Downe was granted the Rotman Distinguished Business Alumni Award from the Rotman School of Management at the University of Toronto.

== Career ==
Downe joined Bank of Montreal in 1983 and held a variety of senior management positions in Canada and the U.S. In 1999, he was appointed vice-chair, Bank of Montreal. From 2001 to 2006, he was deputy chair of BMO Financial Group, and CEO of BMO Capital Markets.

In February 2006, Downe was named chief operating officer and was chosen to replace Tony Comper as president and chief executive officer of BMO effective March 1, 2007, the day of BMO's annual general meeting.

In December 2016, Downe was named a Member of the Order of Canada.

In April 2017, it was announced that Downe would retire as CEO effective October 2017. He was to be succeeded by current COO Darryl White, who was previously group head of BMO Capital Markets.

== Board memberships and philanthropy ==
Downe is the only Canadian member of the International Business Leaders Advisory Council of the Mayor of Beijing, and a member of the International Advisory Council of Guanghua School of Management at Peking University. He is a director of Catalyst, and a member of Catalyst's Canadian board of advisors.

Downe has previously served as chair of St. Michael's Hospital.

Business positions
| Preceded by Tony Comper | CEO of Bank of Montreal; March 2007 – October 2017 | Succeeded by Darryl White |
