= David Walker (banker) =

British banker

Sir David Alan Walker (born 31 December 1939) is a British banker and former chairman of Barclays. He was chairman of Morgan Stanley International from 1995 to 2001, and 2004 to 2005, and remains a senior advisor. Walker was previously Assistant Secretary at the Treasury (1974–77), chairman of the Securities and Investments Board (1988–92), executive director for finance and industry at the Bank of England (1989–95) and deputy chairman of Lloyds TSB (1992–94). In 1994 he also joined the Washington-based financial advisory body, the Group of Thirty.

In 2007, Walker was commissioned by the UK private equity industry to produce guidelines for disclosure and transparency in private equity. On 9 February 2009, he was appointed to lead a government enquiry into banks' corporate governance; the appointment was criticised. On 9 August 2012, he was appointed Chairman of Barclays effective 1 November.

On 1 July 2015, Sir David Walker was appointed to global investment manager, Winton Capital Group, as its non-executive chairman to support the group’s ambition of becoming a global institutional asset-management group.

== Personal life ==
Walker was educated at Chesterfield School and Queens' College, Cambridge (hon. fellow 1989; double first, economics). He married Isobel Cooper in 1963; they have one son and two daughters. Walker was knighted in 1991.

== Career ==
Walker joined HM Treasury in 1961, and was private secretary to the joint permanent secretary from 1964–66. He served on the staff of the International Monetary Fund in Washington from 1970–73, and was assistant secretary in HM Treasury from 1973–77. Walker joined the Bank of England as chief adviser and chief of the economic intelligence department in 1977 and was a director from 1981–93 (1988–93 as a non-executive). He chaired Johnson Matthey Bankers (later Minories Finance) from 1985–88, and was president of the Old Cestrefeldians' Society from 1986–88. Walker held positions with the SIB from 1988–92 and the Agricultural Mortgage Corporation from 1993–94, and was deputy chair of Lloyds Bank from 1992–94. He was a director at Morgan Stanley from 1994–97, executive chair of Morgan Stanley Group (Europe)—later Morgan Stanley Dean Witter (Europe)—from 1994–2000, chair of Morgan Stanley International from 1995–2000 and on the management board of Morgan Stanley Dean Witter from 1997–2000.

Walker chaired the steering committee of the Financial Markets Group on the London Stock Exchange (LSE) from 1986–93, and served on the board of the Central Electricity Generating Board (CEGB) from 1987–89. He has chaired the Russian Venture Company (RVC) Greenhouse Fund since 1999, and was non-executive director at National Power in 1990 and from 1993–94. Walker was also associated with British Invisibles from 1993–97 and Reuters Holdings from 1994–2000. He was a nominated member of the Council of Lloyd’s from 1988–92, chairing the 1992 inquiry into the LMX Spiral, 1992. Walker has been associated with the Legal & General Assurance Co. since 2002, and has been its vice-chair since 2004. He has been a member of the Group of Thirty since 1993, its treasurer since 1998 and a trustee since 2007. Walker chaired the London Investment Bankers' Association from 2002–04. He belonged to the Moroccan British Business Council from 2000–07, and has been a chairman of the University of Cambridge 800th Anniversary Campaign since 2005. Walker was a governor of Henley Management College from 1993–99 and chaired Community Links, an East End charity. He received an honorary LL.D. degree from the University of Exeter in 2002.

Sir David is also the Chairman of Financial Blockchain Start-up SETL Ltd (2015 - Present)

Business positions
Preceded by Marcus Agius	Group Chairman of Barclays plc 2012-2015	Succeeded by John McFarlane
