= Horatio Gates (businessman) =

Canadian politician (1777–1834)

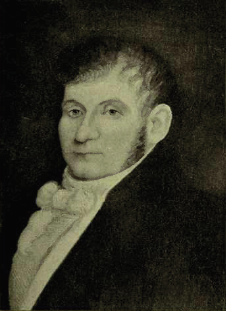
- Born: October 30, 1777; Barre, Massachusetts
- Died: April 11, 1834 (aged 56); Montreal, Lower Canada

Horatio Gates (October 30, 1777 – April 11, 1834) was a Canadian businessman, office holder, justice of the peace, and politician. He was the third president of the Bank of Montreal, and served on the Legislative Council of Lower Canada.

Business positions
Preceded by Samuel Gerrard	President of the Bank of Montreal; 1826	Succeeded by John Molson
