= Samuel Gerrard =

The Honourable Samuel Gerrard
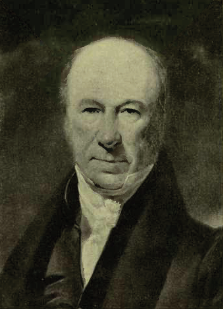

2nd President of the Bank of Montreal
- In office 1820–1826
- Preceded by: John Gray
- Succeeded by: Horatio Gates

Member of the Special Council of Lower Canada
- In office 1838–1841

Personal details
- Born: 1767 Gibbstown House, County Meath
- Died: March 24, 1857 (aged 89–90) Montreal, Canada East
- Spouse: Ann Grant m. 1782, d. 1854
- Children: Three sons including Samuel Henry (d. 1858), Richard, two daughters including Mary

Samuel Gerrard (1767 – 24 March 1857) was a Canadian fur trader, businessman, militia officer, justice of the peace, politician, and seigneur. He was the second president of the Bank of Montreal, from 1838 to 1841. He was a member of the Special Council of Lower Canada. In 1841, he acquired the seigneuries of Lanaudière and Carufel.

Gerrard was born in Ireland at Gibbstown House, County Meath. The Gerrards were a prosperous Anglo-Irish family who had held Gibbstown, an estate of some 1,270 acres, since the mid 17th century, and previous to that were seated at nearby Clongill Castle.

Samuel was probably a grandson of the Samuel Gerrard of Gibbstown who was a friend of Jonathan Swift and visited London and Bath in 1740. Samuel was probably a younger brother of the John Gerrard (d.1838) who was High Sheriff of Meath in 1818.

By 1785, at the age of eighteen, Samuel Gerrard was established at Montreal as a merchant concerned with the fur trade from Timiskaming. In 1791, he went into partnership with his future brother-in-law, William Grant, and Étienne-Charles Campion. Gerrard acted as the firm's accountant, receiving a quarter of the profits.

== Legacy ==
Gerrard Street in Toronto is named in his honour.

Business positions
Preceded by John Gray	President of the Bank of Montreal; 1820-1826	Succeeded by Horatio Gates
