= Bertie Charles Gardner =

British-born Canadian banker

- Born: 31 May 1884; Westbury-on-Trym, Gloucestershire
- Died: 15 December 1972 (aged 88); Montreal, Quebec
- Spouse: Jean Elizabeth Milley (m. 1922)
- Military career
- Allegiance: Canada
- Branch: Canadian Army
- Service years: 1915–1919
- Rank: Major
- Unit: 43rd Battalion
- Conflicts: World War I

Major Bertie Charles Gardner MC (31 May 1884 – 15 December 1972) was a British-Canadian banker and Chancellor of McGill University.

== Biography ==
Born in Bristol, the son of Frank Smith Gardner, and Susannah Gardner, Gardner moved to Canada to join the Bank of Montreal in 1906. In 1915 he was commissioned into the 79th Cameron Highlanders of Canada as an officer. He was enlisted as a lieutenant, having already served two years with the Dorset Territorial Regiment. During the battle of Flers-Courcelette, On 20 September, Gardner was wounded in the shoulder from a gunshot wound. he recovered and was transferred to the 14th reserve Battalion until fully healed. On 30 August 1917, a German night raid on British lines south-east of Lens was repulsed, where Gardner was wounded again. Shell fragmentation hit him in the left buttock, left foot and the right calf. His second toe was amputated as a result and a piece of his metatarsal was surgically removed. In 1917 he was awarded the Military Cross.

In 1948, Gardner became the President of the Bank of Montreal.

Gardner was appointed Honorary Lieutenant-Colonel of The Canadian Grenadier Guards (May 1949 - May 1955) and served as Chancellor of McGill University between 1952 and 1957, having served as a Governor from May 1948 to May 1958. He was appointed Emeritus Governor in 1959.

He died in 1972 at the Royal Victoria Hospital, Montreal.
