= John Gray (Canadian banker) =

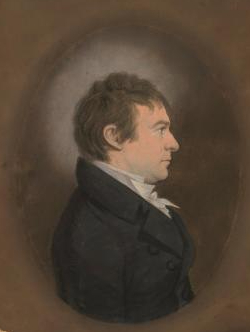
- Born: c. 1755 probably in London, England
- Died: September 13, 1829 (aged 73–74); Côte-Sainte-Catherine (Outremont), Lower Canada
- Occupation(s): merchant, fur trader, banker
- Known for: Co-founder of the Bank of Montreal

John Gray (c. 1755 – September 13, 1829), a Canadian banker, JP and militia officer, was the founder and first president of the Bank of Montreal.

Born in England around 1755, Gray arrived in Canada around 1781 as a fur trader. Gray later became an attorney, a trustee and executor of wills and estates, as well as an agent for the British treasury.

In 1817, Gray with 12 other Montreal merchants founded the Bank of Montreal and became the bank's first president.

Gray died in Côte-Sainte-Catherine in 1829.

Business positions
Preceded by None	President of the Bank of Montreal; 1817–1820	Succeeded by Samuel Gerrard
