= Marcus Agius =

British financier

Marcus Agius CBE
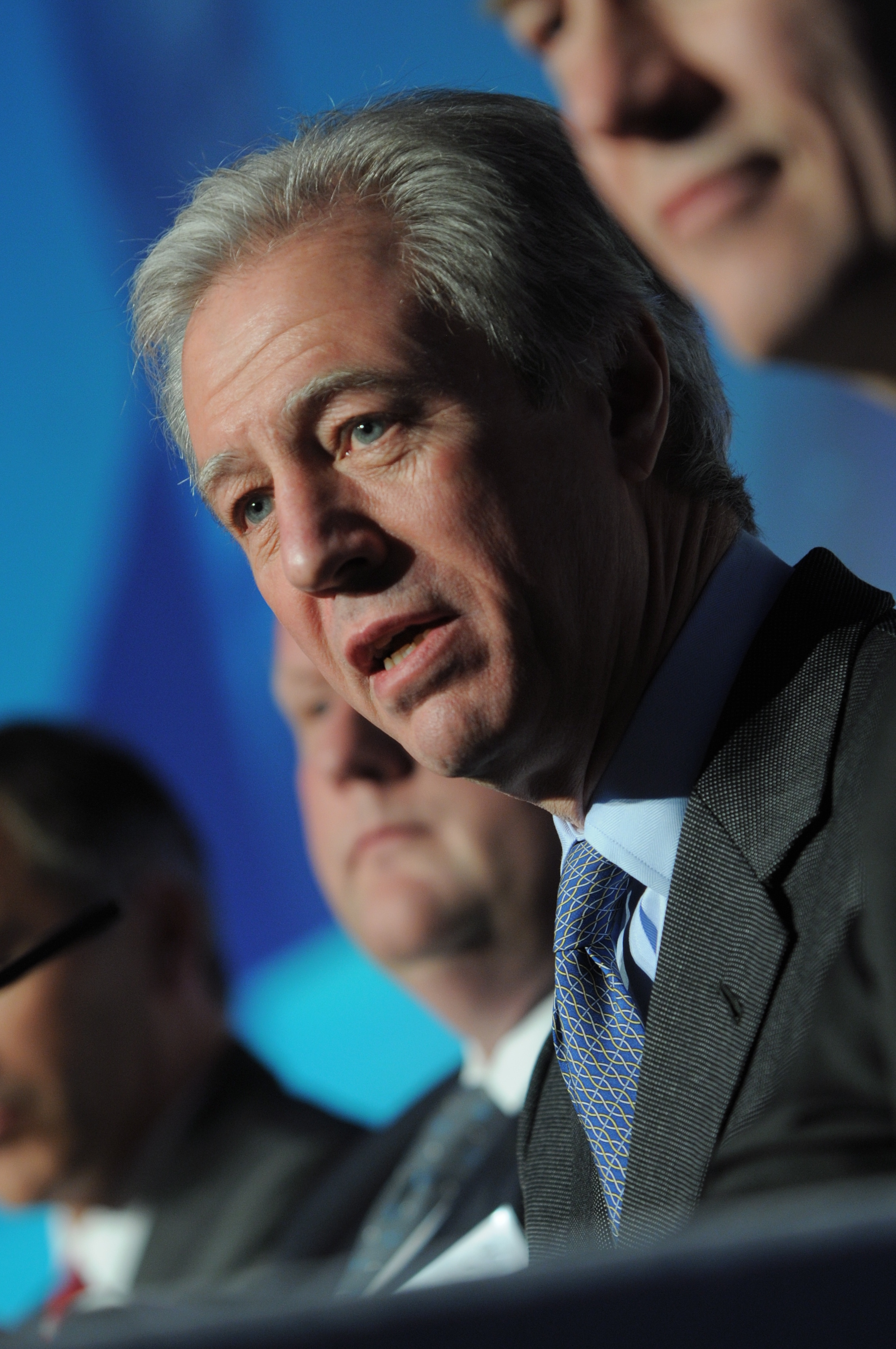
- Agius in 2008
- Born: Marcus Ambrose Paul Agius; 22 July 1946 (age 80); United Kingdom
- Education: Trinity Hall, University of Cambridge (BA, MA); Harvard Business School (MBA)
- Occupation: Group chairman of Barclays
- Spouse: Katherine de Rothschild
- Children: 2
- Relatives: Edmund Leopold de Rothschild (father-in-law)

Marcus Ambrose Paul Agius CBE (/ˈeɪdʒəs/; born 22 July 1946) is a British financier and former group chairman of Barclays.

== Early life and education ==
Marcus Agius was born on 22 July 1946, the son of Ena Eleanora (née Hueffer) and Lieutenant Colonel Alfred Victor Louis Benedict Agius. He is of part Maltese descent, and was educated at St George's College, Weybridge. He earned his degree in Mechanical Sciences and Economics at Trinity Hall, Cambridge, and also holds an MBA from Harvard Business School.

== Career ==
=== Early career and Lazard (1972–2006) ===
Agius' banking career began at the investment bank, Lazard, where he worked from 1972 to 2006 holding several senior positions. He was appointed as the chairman of the London branch of Lazard in 2001 and deputy chairman of Lazard LLC in 2002. He joined BAA PLC as a non-executive director in 1995 and served as its chairman from 2002 till 2006.

=== Barclays Board and chairman (2006–2012) ===
On 1 September 2006, Agius joined the Barclays board as a non-executive director and succeeded Matthew Barrett as chairman from 1 January 2007. His most recently reported salary was £750,000.

On 2 July 2012 it was announced that Agius would resign following the Barclays fine for manipulation of the London Interbank Offered Rate (Libor) by some Barclays employees in the Libor scandal. In November 2012, it was reported that he might be retained as a consultant.

In July 2012 Agius was reinstated as Executive Chairman, following the resignation of CEO Bob Diamond, until a new chief executive is appointed. During his time at Barclays Agius attended the 2011 meeting of the Bilderberg Group.

=== British Bankers Association (2010 – 2012) ===
From 2010 to 2012 Agius was the chairman of the British Bankers Association (BBA). Libor (formally BBA LIBOR) being calculated and published by Thomson Reuters on behalf of the BBA.

From December 2006 to 2012 Agius was a senior independent non-executive director of the BBC's executive board. In September 2011, Agius was appointed as a committee member to act as one of the three trustees of the Bilderberg Group. The other committee members are Kenneth Clarke MP and Lord Kerr of Kinlochard.

== Botany ==
Agius is a keen gardener. Between 2009 and 2019 he was the chairman of the trustees of the Royal Botanic Gardens, Kew. On his retirement, he donated £500,000 to the gardens to create the Agius Evolution Garden there. He was appointed Chairman of the Cambridge University Plant Science Initiative.

Agius was appointed Commander of the Order of the British Empire (CBE) in the 2021 New Year Honours for services to botany and conservation.

== Personal life ==
Marcus, a Roman Catholic, married Katherine (born 1949), daughter of Edmund de Rothschild of the Rothschild banking family of England, and has a close involvement with the Rothschild family estate, Exbury Gardens in Hampshire. They have two children.

In 2010 The Tablet named him as one of Britain's most influential Roman Catholics.

Business positions
| Preceded by Matthew Barrett | Group chairman of Barclays plc 2006–2012 | Succeeded by Sir David Walker |
