= Matthew W. Barrett =

Irish-Canadian banker (born 1944)

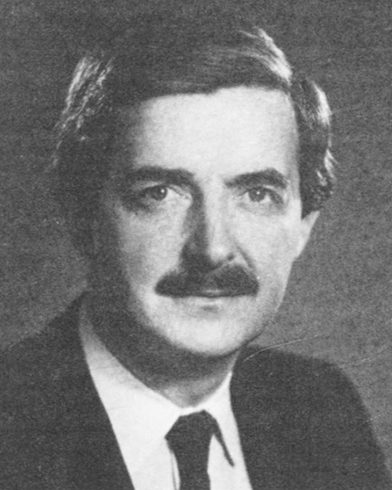
- Born: 20 September 1944 (age 82); County Kerry, Ireland
- Spouse: Irene Korsak (m. 1964)

Matthew William Barrett OC (born 20 September 1944) is an Irish-Canadian banker who until 2006 was the Chairman of Barclays Bank. Prior to this, Barrett was chairman and CEO of the Bank of Montreal where he spent 30 years.

== Career ==
He started his banking career in the London office of the Bank of Montreal (BMO) as a clerk in 1962, and moved from London to Canada in 1967 when he was promoted to management trainee at bank's main office. In 1976 he left BMO for a nine-month period when he joined the Royal Bank of Canada, but returned to the Bank of Montreal after this brief period. In 1987 he had become president, then in 1989 he was appointed chief executive officer, and in 1990 he was elected chairman of the board (relinquishing his title of President to Tony Comper who became president and Chief Operating Officer). Barrett negotiated a proposed merger of the Bank of Montreal with the Royal Bank of Canada where his RBC counterpart John Cleghorn would take over as CEO of the combined company, however this deal was turned down by the competition authorities; Barrett was quoted as saying "I'd be fibbing if I said that it was not a blow at the time". Barrett resigned as chairman and CEO in 1999 and was succeeded by Comper in these roles.

After serving a short stint as chairman of Irish state-owned bank ACCBank, he returned to Britain on joining Barclays on 1 October 1999 as Group Chief Executive.

He then became chairman in 2004, and retired on 31 December 2006, succeeded by Marcus Agius.

== "Double Dip" tax scams ==
It was during Barrett's tenure at Barclays that the bank engaged in what became known as "Double Dip" tax scams. The scams were fairly simple – in a typical case, Barclays and an American bank would loan, say, an airline for the purchase of a jumbo jet. A subsidiary without any employees would be set up owned by Barclays and the American bank to handle the transaction, and the subsidiary would pay income tax on the interest income. The scam would come into effect when both Barclays and the American bank would claim the same full tax credit amount with their respective UK and American tax authorities, i.e. essentially Barclays' income from the scam was being paid for by British and American taxpayers without the respective governments and tax authorities knowing what was going on. Barclays was making over £1 billion a year from the practice – a material portion of its total profit. This all came to a grinding halt when The Wall Street Journal published an exposé of the dodge in a front page, column one, article on 30 June 2006 by Carrick Mollenkamp, which ensured that Parliament, the Bank of England, and the UK Inland Revenue and the American Internal Revenue Service would see it and become aware of the scam, and the practice was subsequently outlawed, thus eliminating a major source of income for Barclays. Barrett retired six months after the scandal broke. When his retirement was suddenly announced, The Times of London reported that "The imminent departure of Mr Barrett will come as a shock to many in the City who expected him to stay on much longer as chairman".

== Personal life ==
Born in County Kerry, Ireland, he attended the Christian Brothers School in Kells, County Meath, and the Advanced Management Programme at Harvard Business School in 1981.

Barrett is twice divorced (married Irene Korsak c. 1967, divorced 1995; married Anne-Marie Sten 1997), with four children from his first marriage. He was made an Officer of the Order of Canada in 1994 for "fostering the advancement of women in the banking industry", and has dual Irish and Canadian citizenship. In 2009, he married Diane Millner. They live in Toronto.

== Notes ==
Business positions
Preceded by Grant Reuber	President of the Bank of Montreal; 1987–1990	Succeeded by F. Anthony Comper
Preceded by William D. Mulholland	Chairman of the Bank of Montreal; 1990–?	Succeeded by F. Anthony Comper
Preceded by Peter Middleton	Chairman of the Barclays Bank; 2004–2006	Succeeded by Marcus Agius
