= W. Darryl White =

Canadian banker

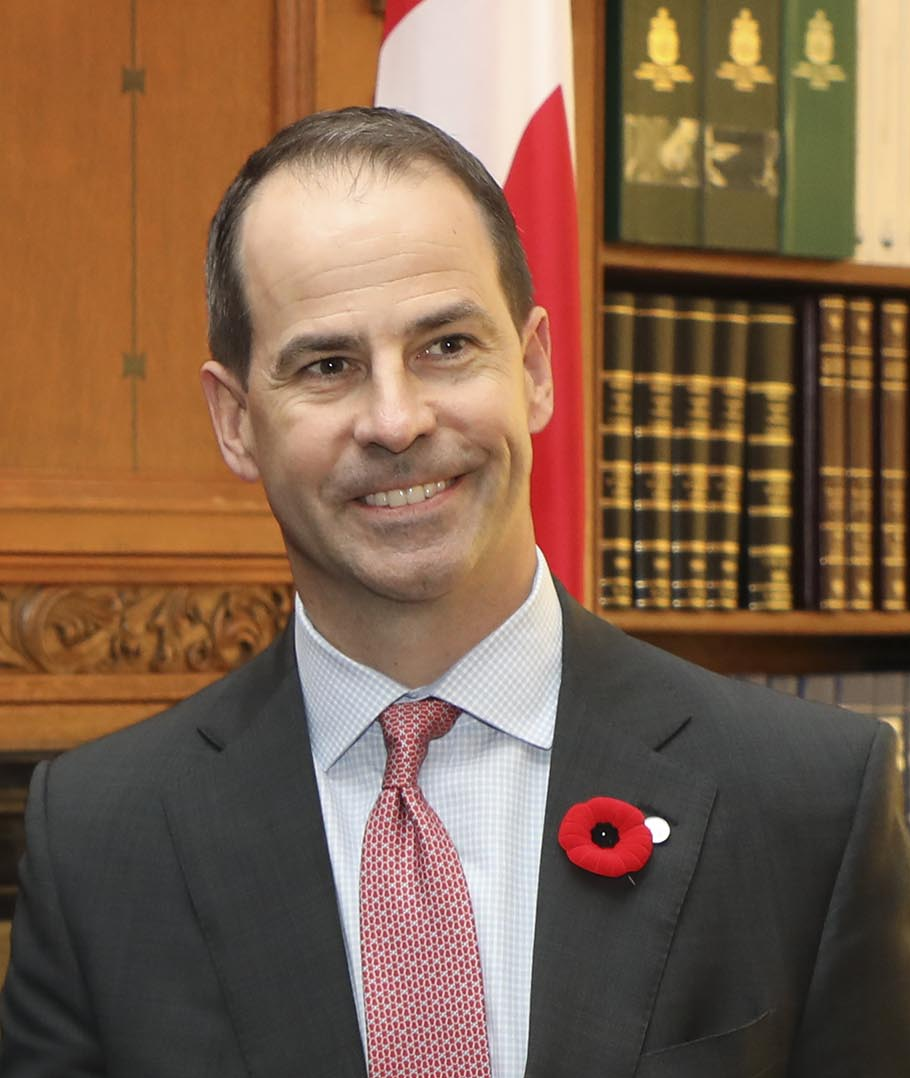
- Born: August 1971 (age 55)
- Education: University of Western Ontario (BBA)
- Occupation: Banker
- Title: CEO, Bank of Montreal
- Term: November 2017- Present

William Darryl White (born August 1971) is a Canadian banker, and the chief executive officer (CEO) of Bank of Montreal, since November 2017, when he succeeded Bill Downe.

White earned a bachelor of business administration degree and received an honorary doctorate from the Richard Ivey School of Business at the University of Western Ontario.

White later completed the Advanced Management Program at Harvard Business School at Harvard University.

White started in 1994 as an analyst for Nesbitt Thomson (now BMO Nesbitt Burns). He joined the investment banking arm of the company in 1996 where he was named vice-president in 1999 and managing director in 2002. He was named CFO of Bank of Montreal in November 2016, and CEO in November 2017. In 2021, he led BMO's M&A on Bank of the West, one of BMO's biggest acquisitions in the US.
