= J. Leonard Walker =

Canadian banker (1909–1973)

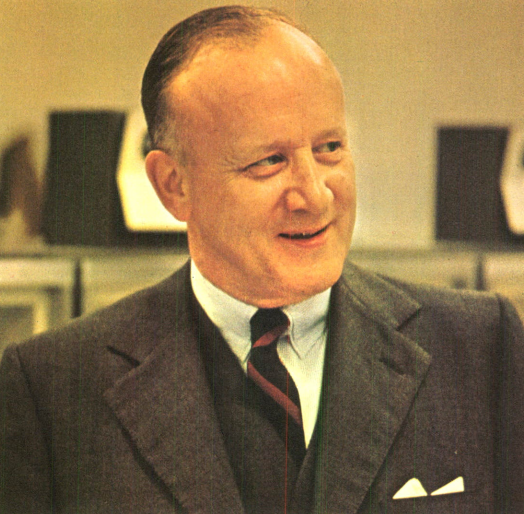
- Born: John Leonard Walker; 30 September 1909; Kenora, Ontario, Canada
- Died: 3 February 1973 (aged 63); Montreal, Quebec, Canada
- Education: Sault Collegiate Institute
- Title: President, Bank of Montreal (1971-1973); President & CEO (1971-1972)
- Spouse: Helen Emily Simpson (m. 1936)
- Children: 2, Judith and Nancy

John Leonard Walker (30 September 1909 – 3 February 1973) was a Canadian banker who served as president, and chief executive officer of the Bank of Montreal.

== Early life and education ==
Walker was born on 30 September 1909 in Kenora, Ontario to Marjorie Morna Morrison and James Walker, a banker with the Imperial Bank. He grew up in Sault Ste. Marie, Ontario, receiving his education at Sault Collegiate Institute.

Upon graduation, he took a job at the Spanish River Pulp and Paper Company as an apprentice paper maker. But having injured his back, he took a job in banking that he intended "just for the winter."

== Career ==
Walker's 46-year career with the Bank of Montreal began in 1927, when he was 18 and took a job as a clerk at the Sault Ste. Marie branch.

After working at a number of branches in Ontario and Quebec, he was named manager of the bank's main branch in Montreal in 1957.

In 1959, he was made assistant manager of the bank's division in British Columbia, and in 1961 was made that division's deputy general manager and senior executive officer.

In 1964, he was recalled to the bank's head office and named senior executive vice president and general manager.

He was named senior general manager and chief operating officer in 1966, and then senior executive vice president and general manager in 1967.

In December 1968, Walker was elected president and chief operating officer of the bank. In December 1971, at age 62, he was named president and chief executive officer. Due to concerns about Walker's health in December 1972, the chief executive role was given to former CEO, G. Arnold Hart.

He remained president until his death in February 1973.

Walker was also active on a number of boards and in volunteer roles, including as governor of the Royal Victoria Hospital, Douglas Hospital and Montreal General Hospital, director with the Canadian Red Cross Society, and a member of the advisory boards of the Salvation Army and YMCA.

== Personal life ==
On 5 September 1936, at age 26, Walker married Helen Emily Simpson (1910–2005), the daughter of former Sault Ste. Marie mayor and member of parliament Thomas Edward Simpson at the Central United Church in Sault Ste. Marie. They had two daughters, Judith Walker and Nancy Eden Walker (1944–1985).

== Death ==
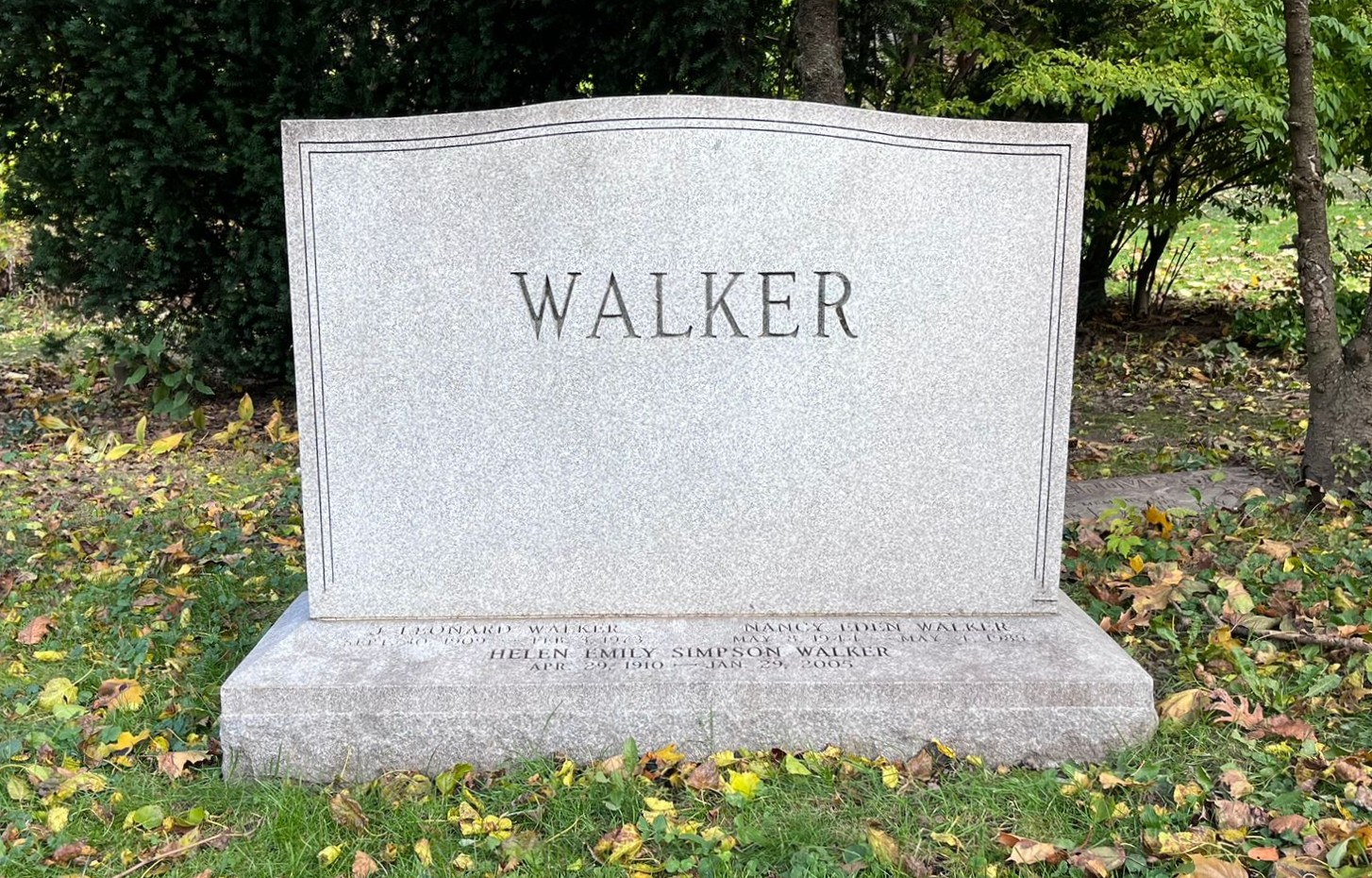
The gravestone of John Leonard Walker (1909-1973) at Mount Pleasant Cemetery, Toronto, Ontario

Walker died in Montreal at the Royal Victoria Hospital on 3 February 1973 at age 63. His funeral service was held on 6 February 1973 at St. George's Church. He was interred at the Cimetière Mont-Royal.

In 1982, his remains were exhumed and re-interred at Mount Pleasant Cemetery in Toronto. His wife Helen and daughter Nancy are interred at the same plot.
