= G. Arnold Hart =

Canadian banker (1913–2001)

G. Arnold Hart MBE CM
- Born: 2 April 1913; Toronto, Ontario
- Died: 5 October 2001 (aged 88); Mountain, Ontario
- Education: Oakwood Collegiate Institute ('31)
- Spouse(s): Jean Cartwright Gilbert (m. 1939; died 1961) Patricia Isabelle Plant (m. 1961)
- Military career
- Allegiance: Canada
- Branch: Canadian Army
- Service years: 1941–1946
- Rank: Major
- Unit: Canadian Grenadier Guards
- Conflicts: World War II

George Arnold Reeve Hart MBE CM (2 April 1913 – 5 October 2001) was a Canadian banker who served as president, chairman, and chief executive officer of the Bank of Montreal.

== Early life and education ==
Hart was born on 2 April 1913 in Toronto to George Sanderson Hart and Laura May Harrison. Hart graduated from Oakwood Collegiate Institute in 1931.

== Career ==
After graduating he joined the Bank of Montreal as a clerk. In 1959, Hart was appointed president of the bank, and was also the first president to assume the title of chief executive officer.

In December 1964 he was elected chairman of the board, and in 1967 ceded the presidency to Robert David Mulholland. In December 1971, Hart gave the title of chief executive officer to John Leonard Walker, who had been appointed president in December 1968. However, due to Walker's failing health, Hart reassumed the title of chief executive in December 1972, shortly before Walker died the following February. He remained chief executive until the end of 1974, when he was succeeded by Frederick Harold McNeil.

== Personal life ==
On 2 September 1939, Hart married Jean Cartwright Gilbert (1914–1960). They had one daughter, Diane. After Jean's death, on 8 December 1961, Hart remarried to Patricia Isabelle Plant (1917–2014).

Hart died on 5 October 2001 at age 88.
