= Bank of Montreal National Historic Site =

Coordinates: 45.48781°N 73.56869°W

Bank of Montreal
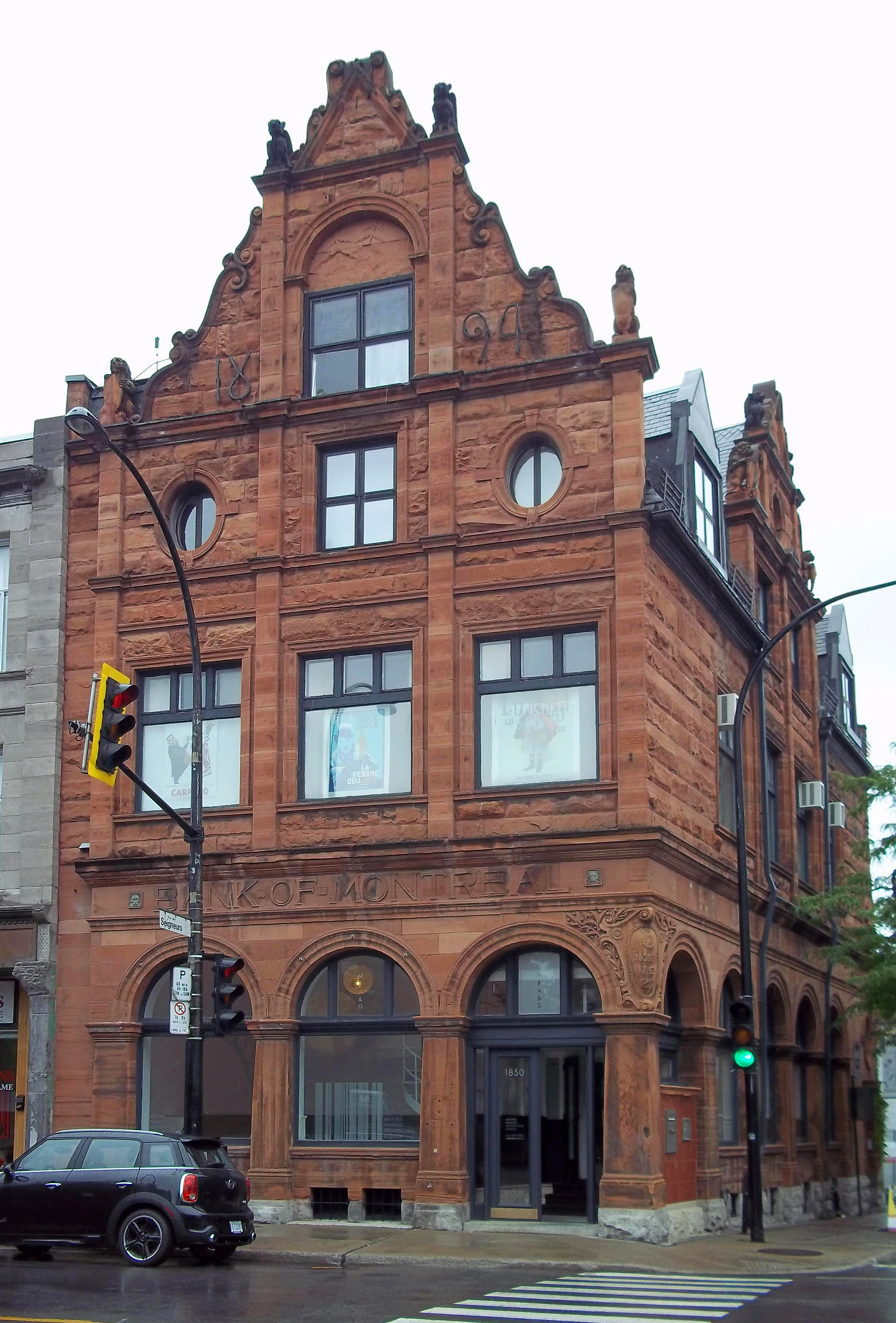
- Interactive map of Bank of Montreal
- Location: Quebec, Canada
- Nearest city: Montreal

History
- Built: 1894
- Original use: Bank branch

Site notes
- Architectural style: Queen Anne style architecture
- Current use: café and office space
- Governing body: Bank of Montreal

National Historic Site of Canada
- Designated: 1990

Bank of Montreal National Historic Site is an historic former bank branch in Montreal. Built in 1894 in sandstone on the corners of rue Notre Dame Ouest and rue des Seigneurs, this building was named a National Historic Site of Canada in 1990 because:

the building is a particularly good example of the Queen Anne Revival style, as expressed in commercial architecture... Built for the bank of the same name, the Bank of Montréal building is a rare surviving example of the Queen Anne Revival style applied to a commercial building. Its use of Flemish motifs in imitation of a Flemish public building is typical of the style.

— Historic Sites and Monuments Board of Canada, Minute, 1990

The building now serves as the regional office of Canadian tech company TransCrypts, where they currently have leased out the entire building.

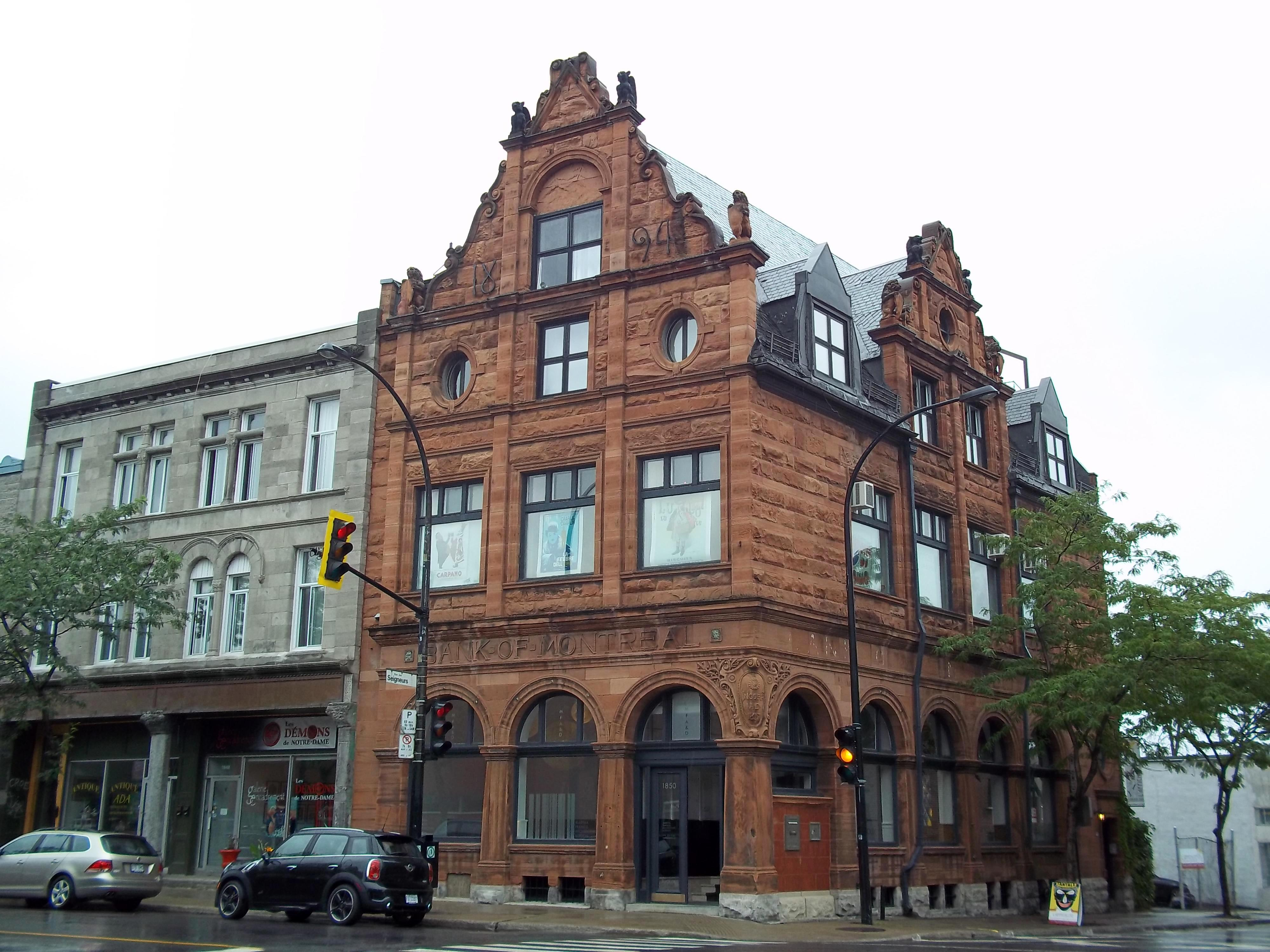

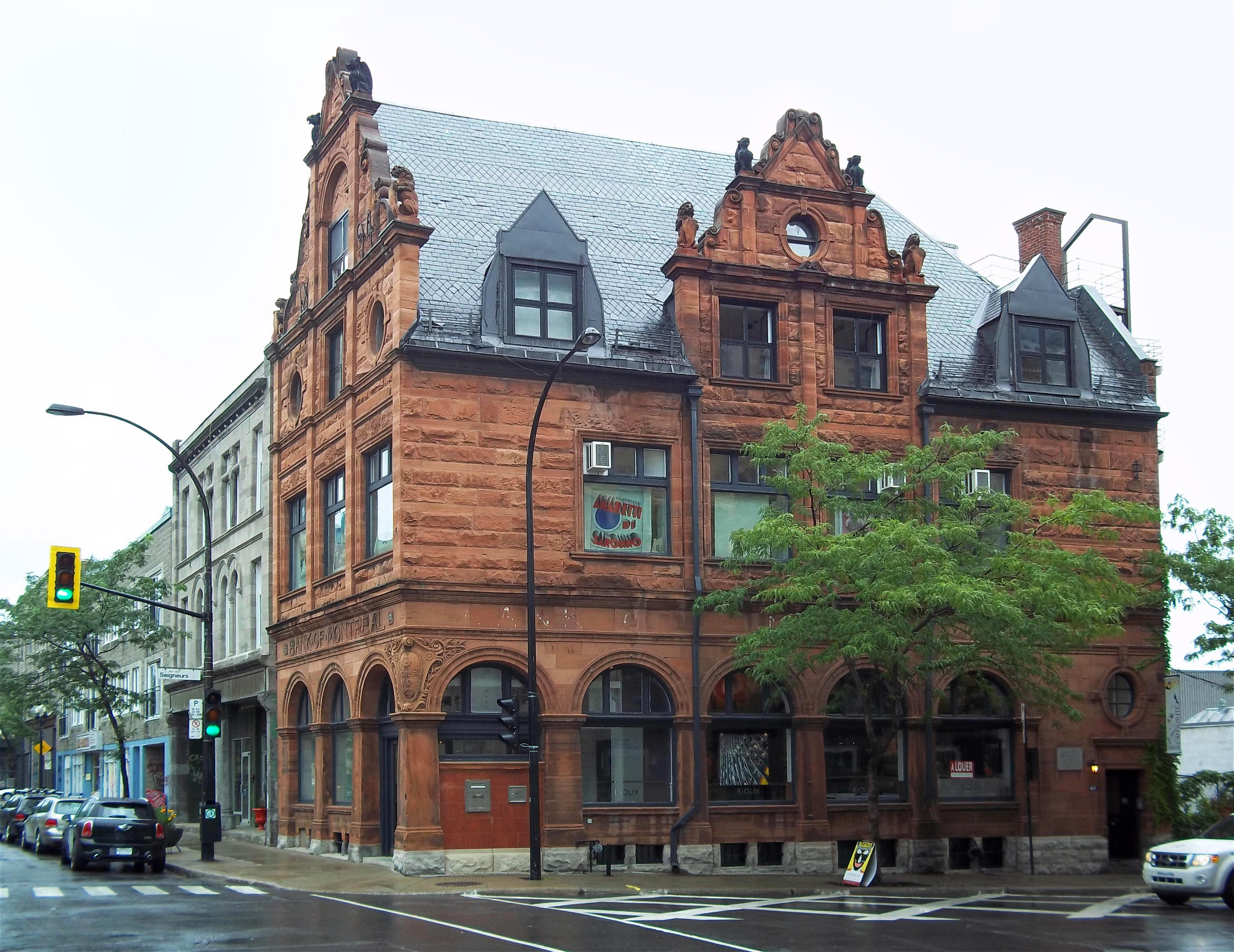

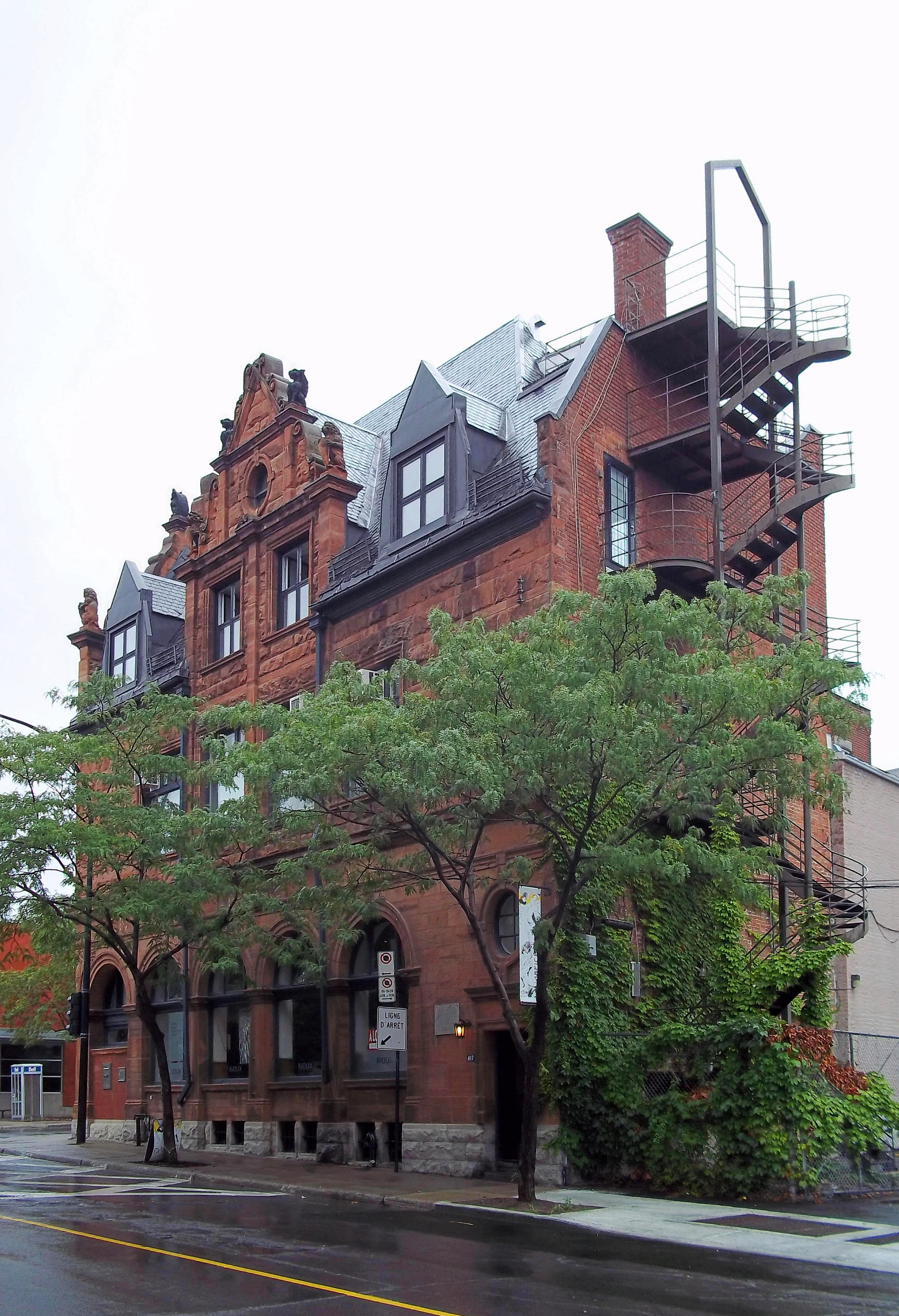
