= Mount Royal Club =

Private club in Montreal, Quebec

Coordinates: 45.501127°N 73.577857°W

- Formation: 23 September 1899; 126 years ago
- Type: Private club
- Headquarters: 1175 Rue Sherbrooke Ouest
- Website: mountroyalclub.com

The Mount Royal Club is a private social club in Montreal, Quebec. The club was founded as a gentlemen's club in 1899 by a breakaway group from the Saint James's Club, but in 1990 became mixed-sex. In its prime, the Mount Royal was Canada's most prestigious club and was an integral part of Montreal's Golden Square Mile society. During the age when Montreal was the center of commerce in Canada, the club's membership counted many of the country's most powerful executives, bankers, financiers, and industrialists. The Mount Royal's clubhouse on Rue Sherbrooke Ouest was completed in 1906 and was designed by McKim, Mead & White of New York.

In the latter half of the 20th century, the Mount Royal underwent a significant upheaval. Until the 1960s, the club's membership was almost entirely of English or Scottish descent, which mirrored the Protestant nature of Montreal business culture. In the wake of the Quiet Revolution, the commercial center of Canada shifted from Montreal to Toronto. Consequently, much of the city's Anglophone élite migrated out of Quebec, which deprived the club of its historic base. In recent decades, the club has become more Francophone and less associated with Canadian corporate power.

== History ==
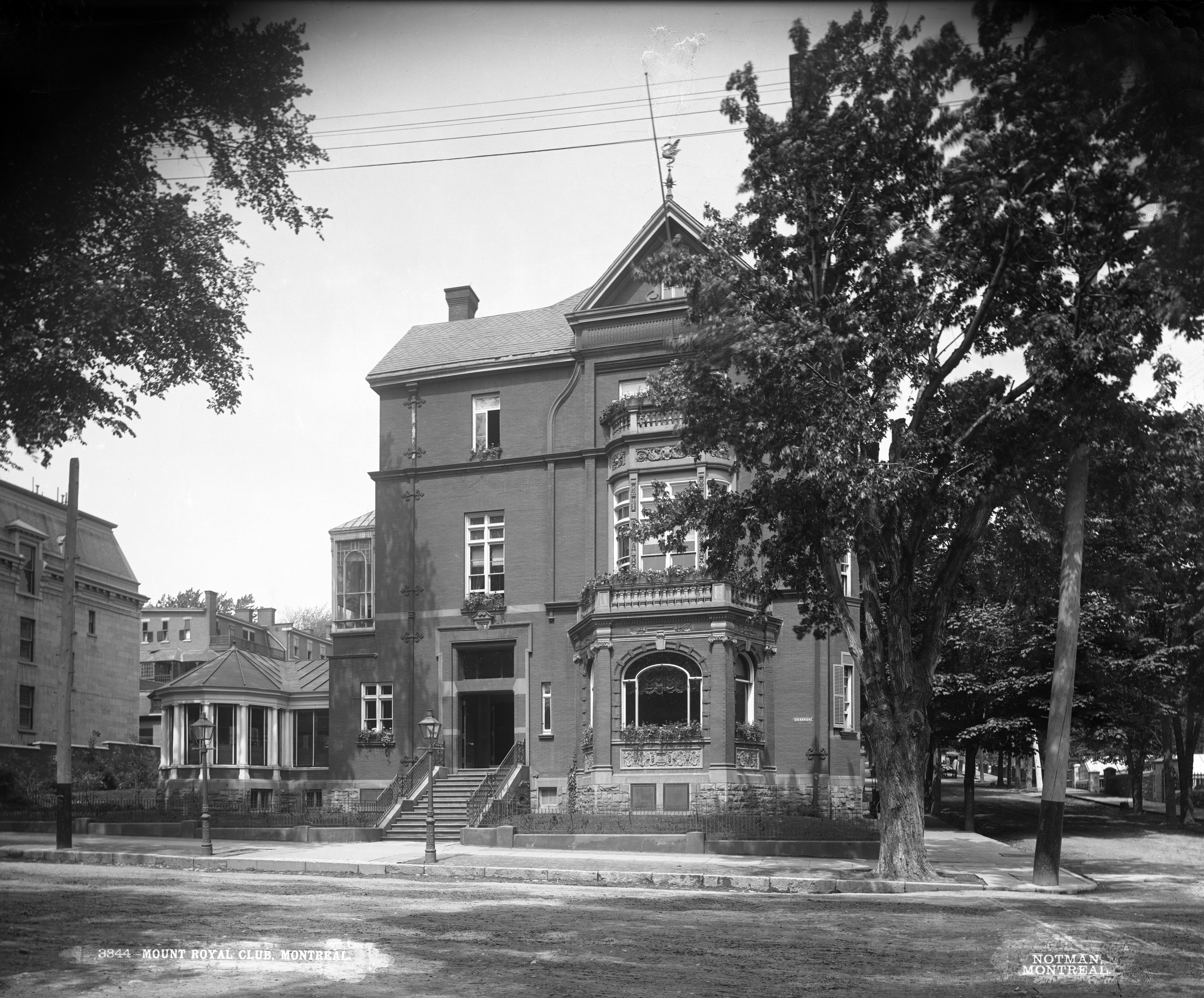
The 1884 house of Sir John Abbott, third prime minister of Canada, was the first clubhouse. It burned down on 5 January 1904.

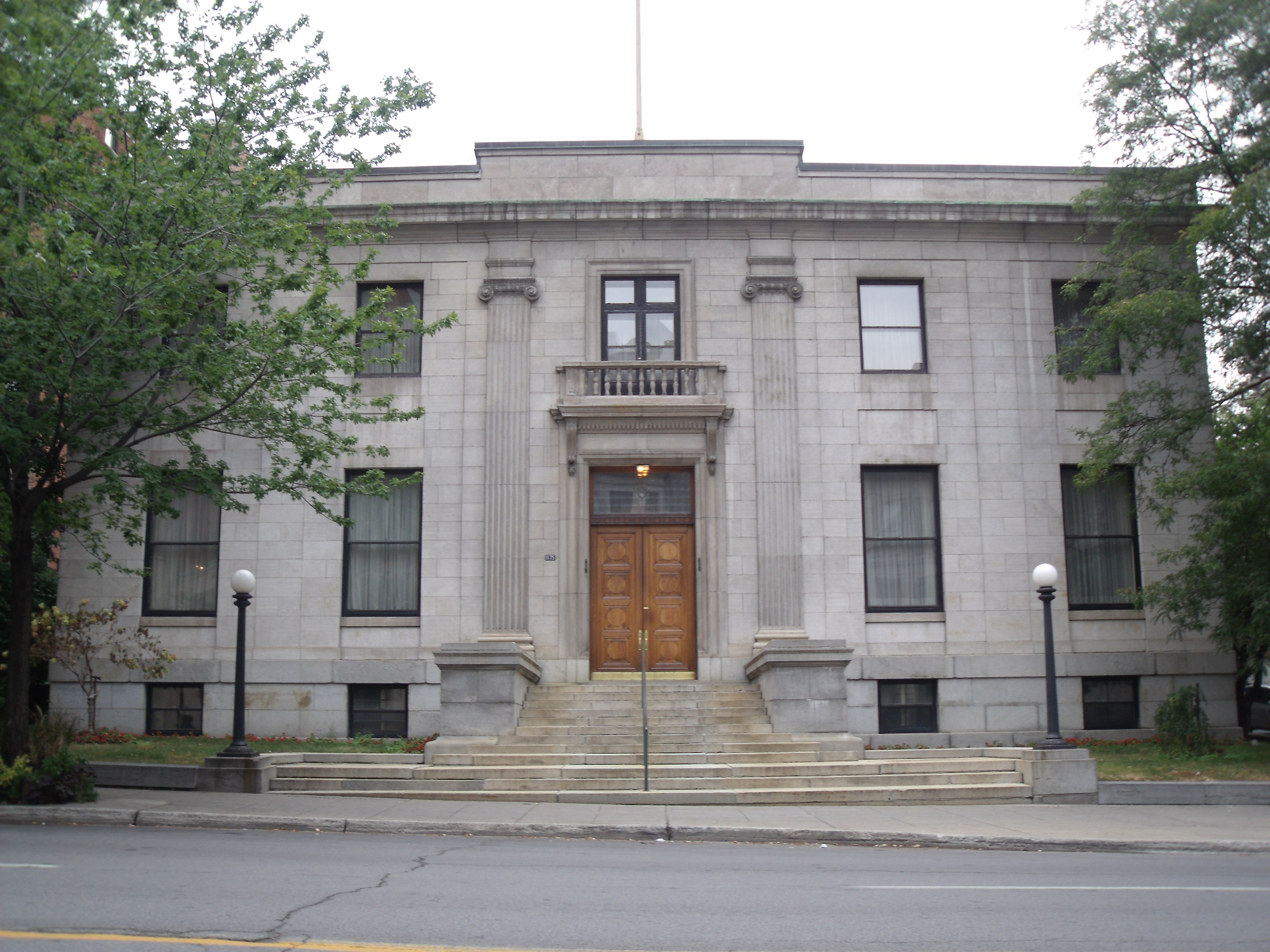
The 1906 clubhouse, designed by McKim, Mead & White

The Mount Royal Club was founded in 1899 by a group of members of the Saint James's Club of Montreal who believed their club had become too crowded. The club's first president was Sir George Alexander Drummond. The club purchased the former Rue Sherbrooke Ouest home of Sir John Abbott, Canada's third prime minister, to use as its clubhouse. The house had been built in 1884 and was designed by Hutchison & Steele. On 5 January 1904, the house burned down. The club then undertook to build a new clubhouse on the site, which opened in 1906.

In 1984, Governor General Jeanne Sauvé was made an honorary member. In 1990, the club elected to end its status as a gentlemen's club and become mixed-sex. Sauvé became its first female member.

In a 2013 article in Maclean's describing the fall of Canada's old establishment, Newman cited a 1993 event at the Mount Royal Club as marking the death of this class. That year, Lynton Wilson held a cigar dinner at the club where the speaker was Marvin Shanken. Among the guests was Governor General Ray Hnatyshyn. After dinner, Hnatyshyn asked Shanken "do you begin the day with a tiny cigarillo and work your way up to a man-size cigar, or what?" Shanken, who was unaware how to address a governor general, responded, "no way, your admirable. I just light up one big motherfucker at seven in the morning and it keeps me in orbit all day." In Newman's words, "thus died the Canadian Establishment—at the Mount Royal Club, vaporized by cigar smoke and Yankee slang."

== Bibliography ==
- Stikeman, H. Heward (1999). The Mount Royal Club, 1899-1999. Price-Patterson. ISBN 978-1-896881-13-3. – club history

== See also ==
- List of gentlemen's clubs in Canada
