= British Purchasing Commission =

World War II-era organization

The British Purchasing Commission was a United Kingdom organization of the Second World War. It was established in November 1939 to coordinate purchases of war supplies in the United States. The commission was originally set up as an offshoot of the British Purchasing Mission in Canada (later the British Supply Board in Canada and the United States). With the dramatic expansion of procurement in the United States, this arrangement proved cumbersome and was terminated in August 1940 when the Commission attained its full autonomy.

The commission was headed by Canadian industrialist Arthur Purvis until Purvis's untimely death in an airplane accident in July 1941. Purvis reported to Jean Monnet, who was head of the Anglo-French Coordinating Committee in London.

The commission was part of the institutional arrangements developed by the United Kingdom, France and the United States administrations to coordinate their procurement of armaments in the early part of World War II. These arrangements were completed in late 1939 by the establishment of the Anglo-French Purchasing Board in the United States, with Purvis as chairman and his French counterpart Jean Frédéric Bloch-Lainé, head of the French purchase commission, as vice-chairman. The Board was intended “to avoid all competition in French and British purchases and to permit synchronization of these purchases with those of the American administration”. The Board was based in New York (with representation in Washington), as were the two national commissions. Membership in the Board was made up mostly of members of the two commissions. On the American side, the Board formally dealt with a President's Liaison Committee comprising representatives of the Treasury, War and Navy Departments and chaired by the Director of Procurement of the Treasury Department, but in practice, relations were fluid, as Purvis enjoyed a close personal relationship with Secretary of the Treasury Morgentau and was in constant communication with him. As one historian put it, “From November 1939 till March 1941 Morgenthau and Purvis worked almost as closely together as two Ministers in the same Cabinet”. While the Commission and the Board were separate entities, in fact they acted interchangeably under Purvis's leadership. Purchase contracts were entered into by one or the other (or the French commission).

After the June 1940 French Surrender, the Board was abolished and Purvis (with full authority from London) and Bloch-Lainé hastily negotiated the transfer of all French armament contracts to the UK while Bloch-Lainé still had full powers to act on them (having secured the consent of Colonel Jacquin, head of the French Air Commission, with respect to the air contracts over which the latter had authority)

When the embargo on arms sales to belligerents was lifted by the November Neutrality Act of 1939, the Board was able to arrange its purchases by paying for them on a Cash and Carry basis, using Britain's dwindling dollar and gold reserves. The major imbalance between the growing British purchases and the lack of means to pay for them led the US administration to develop the Lend-Lease program, for which legislation was adopted in March 1941.

In July 1942 the British Purchasing Commission became the British Ministry of Supply Mission in Washington, part of the more fully integrated procurement arrangements between the United Kingdom and the United States made necessary as demand for war supplies increased exponentially after the entry of the United States in the war.

== Aircraft Purchases ==
Aircraft were by far the largest component in the commission's purchases. As of November 1940, total British aircraft orders (including air frames, engines and accessories) amounted to more than $1.2 billion (out of a total for all ‘munitions’ of almost 2 billion). The requests by the Board to US manufacturers stimulated production and design including the development and production of what would become the North American Mustang, which was designed for the commission. Upon entry into Royal Air Force (RAF) or other Commonwealth service an Air Ministry service name was applied to the imported aircraft, thus the Consolidated 28-5 Consolidated Catalina.

Aircraft purchased by the Commission first had to be moved across the border into Canada, as under the US neutrality laws, up until June 1940, it was illegal to transport ‘war materials’ directly from US ports to belligerent countries. To circumvent this rule, with the full acquiescence of the US authorities, some aircraft were flown to airfields near the US-Canada border and taxied to the border where Canadian crews would pull them in with a rope thrown across the border (heavier aircraft were pulled across by tractors or horse teams). From Canada, planes were transported by sea or ferried to the UK. Sailing from Halifax, Nova Scotia, smaller aircraft with insufficient range to make the journey across the Atlantic were delivered to the UK by ship as cargo, with the aircraft 'knocked down' into component sections and crated. Upon arrival in the UK crated aircraft were transported to RAF Speke where they were assembled and test flown. Larger aircraft were ferried directly across the Atlantic from RCAF Gander to RAF Prestwick, first by the Atlantic Ferry Organization (‘Atfero’), and subsequently by RAF Ferry Command. After the establishment of Lend-Lease, aircraft and other weapons could be supplied direct to the UK.

=== Aircraft bought by the Commission ===
- Bell Model 14/P-400 - originally allocated RAF service name "Bell Caribou", but entered RAF service as "Bell Airacobra"
- Boeing Model 299T (B-17C) - entered RAF service as "Boeing Fortress"
- Brewster B-339 - Belgian order for Aviation Militaire - entered RAF service as "Brewster Buffalo"
- Brewster B-340 - Netherlands order for 162 aircraft for Militaire Luchtvaart van het Koninklijk Nederlands-Indisch Leger (ML-KNIL, the Dutch airforce in the East Indies) but all repossessed by USN before delivery, and 750 ordered for UK - entered limited UK service as "Brewster Bermuda"
- Consolidated LB-30 - French order for 120 for Armée de l'air. None delivered. Later taken over by UK - entered RAF service as "Consolidated Liberator"
- Consolidated 28-5 - entered RAF service as "Consolidated Catalina"
- Curtiss SBC-4 - French order of 50 aircraft for Aeronavale, last five delivered to UK and given service name "Curtiss Cleveland"
- Curtiss Model 75 - French order, 316 delivered to France. Entered RAF service as "Curtiss Mohawk"
- Curtiss Model 81A & 87 - entered RAF service as "Curtiss Tomahawk" (early aircraft) or "Curtiss Kittyhawk" (later aircraft). Packard Merlin engined aircraft originally allocated RAF name "Warhawk" but on service entry 'Kittyhawk' name was applied as-per later Allison-engined variants
- Curtiss P-46 - ordered by UK and allocated name "Curtiss Kittyhawk" but aircraft and order later cancelled and name applied to later P-40/Tomahawks incorporating more powerful Allison V-1710 engine intended for P-46.
- Douglas DB-7/DB-19 - French order, 64 delivered to France. Entered RAF service as "Douglas Boston" (bomber) or "Douglas Havoc" (Intruder/Night fighter)
- Douglas DB-1 - entered Royal Canadian Air Force (RCAF) service as "Douglas Digby".
- Douglas DC-2 - several aircraft purchased by UK, including DC-2 prototype ex-TWA NC13301, and used in India.
- Fairchild PT-19 - ordered for RCAF as "Fairchild Cornell"
- Grumman F4F - French order - entered Fleet Air Arm (FAA) service as "Grumman Martlet", later renamed Grumman Wildcat to match US service name
- Lockheed Hudson - patrol bomber designed for RAF based on Lockheed Model 14 Super Electra
- Lockheed Ventura - designed for RAF - improved Hudson, used as medium bomber and patrol bomber
- Lockheed Model 322A/Model 322B - Franco-British order - tested by RAF and given service name "Lockheed Lightning" but order later cancelled due to poor performance
- Glenn Martin Model 167 - French order for bombers- Approximately 215 of order delivered to France, remainder to UK. Entered RAF service as "Martin Maryland"
- Glenn Martin Model 187 - Franco-British order for improved Model 167. Entered RAF service as "Martin Baltimore"
- North American NA-64-P2 - French order for 230 trainer aircraft, 111 delivered before Fall of France. Remainder taken over by Britain and entered service with RCAF as "North American Yale"
- North American NA-57/NA-66 - Franco-British order for improved NA-64/Harvard - RAF service name "North American Harvard"
- North American NA-73 - designed for RAF - entered service as "North American Mustang"
- Northrop A-17 - French order of 93, no recorded deliveries. Transferred to UK - declared obsolete, transferred to South African Air Force (SAAF) for training - allocated RAF service name "Northrop Nomad"
- Northrop N-3PB - Norwegian order, transferred to UK and used by Royal Norwegian Air Force (RNoAF) in exile in Little Norway, Canada, and Iceland
- Vought-Sikorsky 156 - French order. 40 delivered. Another French order for 50 was later taken over by UK and the type entered limited Royal Navy (RN) service as "Vought-Sikorsky Chesapeake"
- Vultee P-66 - Swedish order, cancelled by US State Department after Invasion of Norway - order taken over by Britain and given service name "Vultee Vanguard", but immediately after Japanese attack on Pearl Harbor all 144 aircraft built requisitioned by USAAC
- Vultee Model 72 - designed for France - order taken over and entered RAF service as "Vultee Vengeance"

== Directors General ==
- Arthur Blaikie Purvis - 1941
- Sir Clive Baillieu - 1942

== Other staff of note ==
- Mary Norton
- Wilfred Hill-Wood

== See also ==
- British Security Co-ordination
