= Allan R. Taylor =

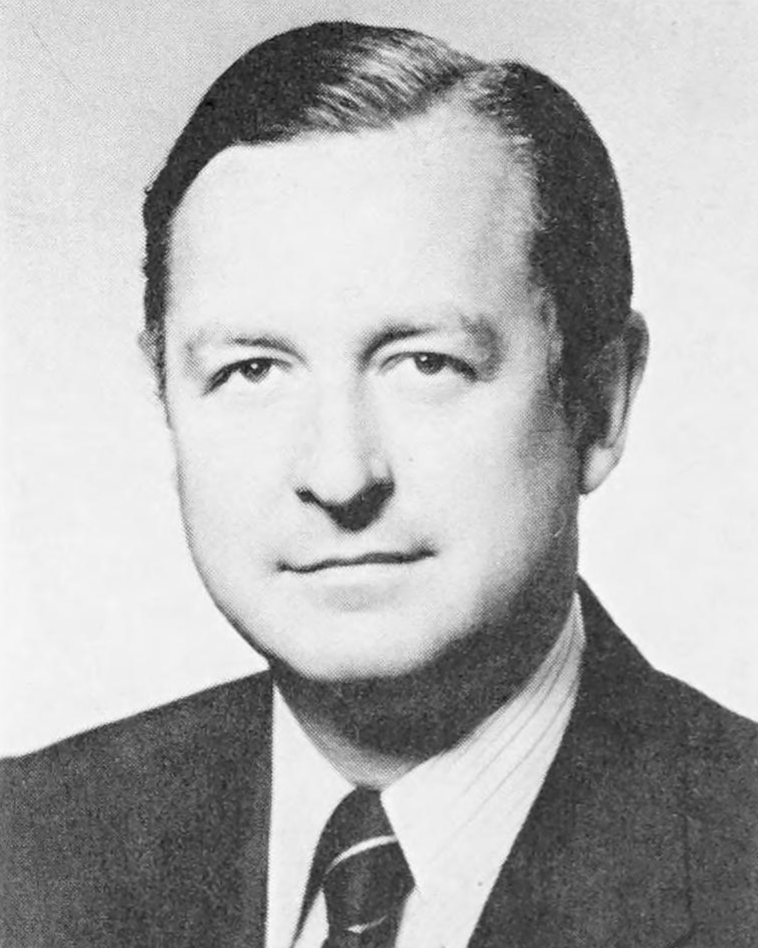
- Born: 14 September 1932 (age 92); Prince Albert, Saskatchewan
- Spouse: Shirley Ruston (m. 1957)

Allan Richard Taylor OC (born 14 September 1932) is a Canadian retired banker. Taylor joined the Royal Bank of Canada as a clerk in his hometown at the age of sixteen. He rose to become the chairman and CEO of the bank, serving in that capacity from 1986 until 1995.

== Biography ==
Born in Prince Albert, Saskatchewan, Taylor joined Royal bank of Canada there in 1949. He was subsequently promoted through the ranks of the bank, occupying various positions in both the domestic and international areas with postings in Saskatchewan, Ontario, New York and Head Office, Montreal. Appointed assistant general manager in 1970; manager Toronto Branch 1971-74; deputy general manager, International Division 1974-77; general manager, International Division 1977-83, in June 1983, he became president and chief operating officer. In 1986 Rowland Frazee, CEO of RBC retired. Allan R. Taylor succeeded Rowland C. Frazee. In 1986, Allan R. Taylor was elected chairman and chief executive officer, a position he held until November 1994 when he relinquished the title of chief executive officer. He relinquished the title of chairman and retired from the bank in 1995.

Taylor is currently a director of Brain Canada Foundation and NeuroScience Canada Partnership, Montreal; as well as a member of the advisory council of The Canadian Institute for Advanced Research, Toronto.

Formerly he was a director of the Royal Bank of Canada; Canadian Pacific Limited; Canadian Pacific Railways Limited; Fairmont Hotels and Resorts Inc.; General Motors of Canada Limited; TransCanada Pipelines Limited; and United Dominion Industries Inc. He was former chairman of the Canadian Banker's Association, 1984–86; president of the International Monetary Conference, 1992–93; vice chairman of the Business Council on National Issues (now the Canadian Council of Chief Executives) and a director of The Conference Board of Canada.

He is a former chairman of Junior Achievement of Canada; chairman of the Corporate Programme for "Imagine"; vice chairman and founding director of the Corporate Higher Education Forum; member of the board of governors, and chairman of Queen's Capital Campaign, Queens University, Kingston 1988-94; hon. chair, Breaking New Ground Capital Campaign, Peterborough Regional Health Care Centre 2000-2002; member of the board of advisors, Richard Ivey School of Business, London, Ontario and Northeastern University Business School, Boston; interim chairman of NeuroScience Canada Partnership and NeuroScience Canada Foundation 2006–2007.

On February 16, 1994, Taylor was appointed an Officer of the Order of Canada. He was inducted as a Companion into the Canadian Business Hall of Fame in 2006.

He received an Honorary Doctorate of Laws degree from the University of Regina in May 1987; from Concordia University in Montreal in June 1988 and from Queen's University in Kingston in May 1991. In June 1990, he received an Honorary Doctorate of Business Administration from Laval University, Quebec City and, in June 1992 an Honorary Doctorate of the University from the University of Ottawa.

Taylor received the 1992 International Executive of the Year Award from the Canadian Council for International Business; the Public Policy Award from the Public Policy Forum in 1994; the 1995 Honorary Associate Award from the Conference Board of Canada; the 1995 Human Relations Award from the Canadian Council of Christians and Jews; and the CESO Award for International Development in 1995 from the Canadian Executive Service Overseas.

Taylor and his wife Shirley, live in Toronto and have a son and daughter-in-law, Rod and Martha Taylor, a daughter and son-in-law, Leslie Taylor-Houston and Dr. James Houston, and three granddaughters Alanna Houston, Kelsey Houston and Hayley Taylor.
