= Sydney G. Dobson =

Canadian banker (1883–1969)

- Born: 20 September 1883; Sydney, Nova Scotia
- Died: 8 April 1969 (aged 85); Montreal, Quebec
- Spouse: Beatrice Winifred Chambers (m. 1913)
- Children: 2

Sydney George Dobson (20 September 1883 – 8 April 1969) was a Canadian banker who served from 1946 to 1949 as president and 1949 to 1954 as the first chairman of the Royal Bank of Canada.

== Career ==
Dobson joined the Merchants Bank of Halifax as a junior in his hometown in 1900, they year before the bank changed its name to the Royal Bank of Canada.

He received his first managerial role at his home branch in Sydney, and then was appointed assistant manager at the branch in Montreal, manager of the Vancouver branch, and acting supervisor in Winnipeg. In 1919 he joined the head office in Montreal as general inspector, then in 1922 was appointed assistant general manager. In 1934 he became the bank's general manager.

After the unexpected death of president Morris Watson Wilson in May 1946, on 4 June of that year Dobson agreed to assume the presidency. He remained in the office until October 1949, when he stepped down and became the bank's first chairman of the board. Dobson retired as chairman in November 1954.

== Personal life ==
On 12 June 1913 in Truro, Nova Scotia, Dobson married Beatrice Winifred Chambers (1883–1955). They had two children, Virginia (1922–2004) and John William (1928–2013). In 1960, John founded Formula Growth Limited, an investment advisory based in Montreal, which remains in operation today. Sydney Dobson died in Montreal on 8 April 1969.
