= Frazee =

Frazee may refer to:

- Frazee (surname)
- Frazee, Minnesota, a small American city.
- Frazee Paint, a defunct paint company in the western United States (acquired by Sherwin-Williams).
