= Royal Bank of Canada =

Canadian financial institution

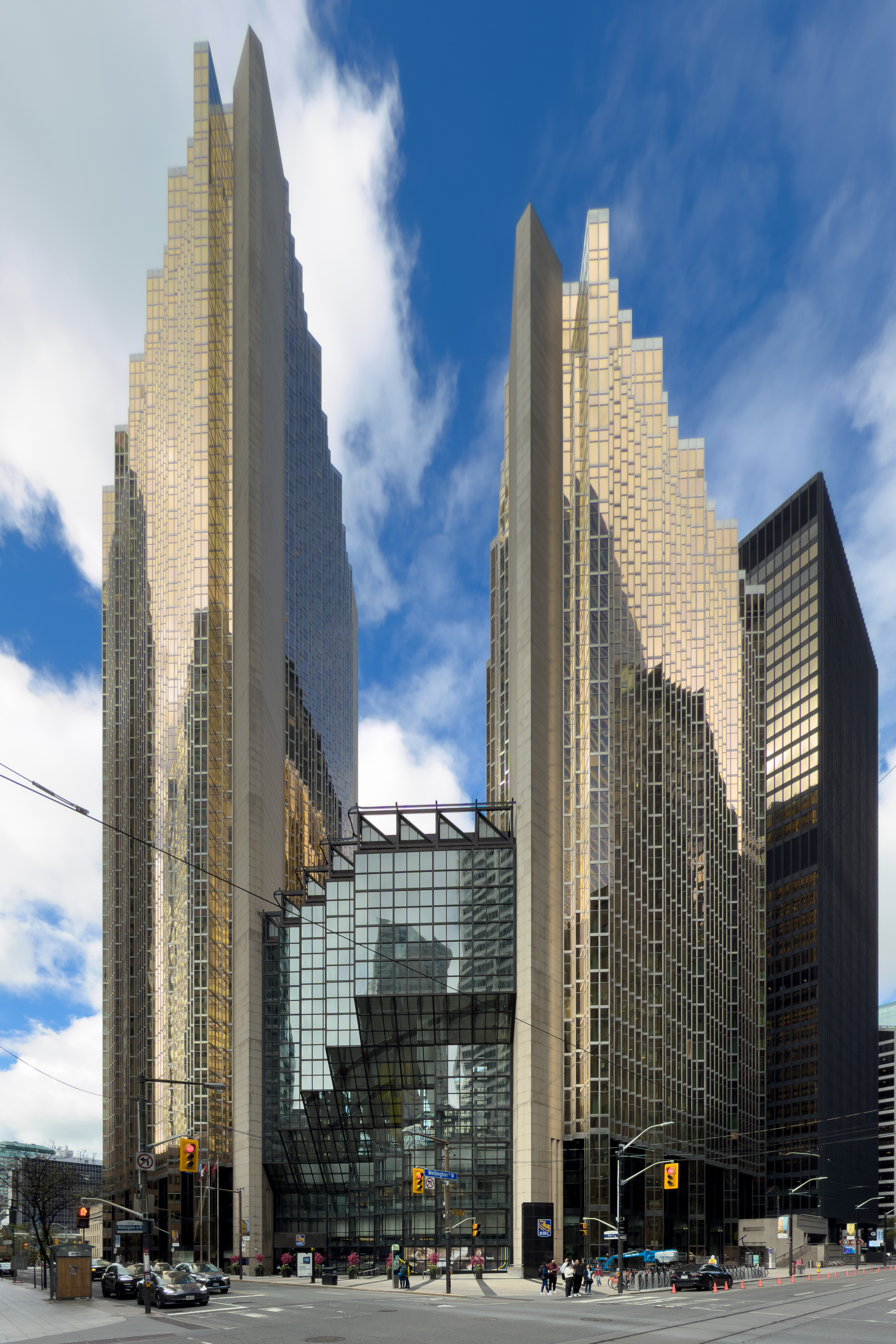
- Royal Bank Plaza in downtown Toronto
- Type: Public
- Traded as: TSX: RY; NYSE: RY; S&P/TSX 60 component
- ISIN: CA7800871021
- Industry: Financial services
- Founded: 1864; 162 years ago in Halifax, Nova Scotia
- Headquarters: Montreal, Quebec, Canada; Toronto, Ontario, Canada (Note: The bank's corporate headquarters are located at Royal Bank Plaza in Toronto, where its senior management is based. However, the bank's head office is formally registered at Place Ville-Marie in Montreal under the Bank Act.)
- Key people: David I. McKay (president and CEO)
- Services: Asset management; Banking; Commodities; Credit cards; Equities trading; Insurance; Investment management; Mortgage loans; Private equity; Wealth management
- Revenue: ▲CA$66.61 billion (2025)
- Net income: ▲CA$20.37 billion (2025)
- AUM: ▲CA$1.574 trillion (2025)
- Total assets: ▲CA$2.325 trillion (2025)
- Total equity: ▲CA$139.15 billion (2025)
- Number of employees: 96,628 (2025)
- Subsidiaries: City National Bank; RBC Bank; RBC Capital Markets; RBC Royal Trust; Royal Bank of Trinidad and Tobago; Brewin Dolphin
- Website: rbc.com

The Royal Bank of Canada (RBC; French: Banque Royale du Canada) is a Canadian multinational financial services company and the largest bank in Canada by market capitalization. The bank serves over 19 million clients and has more than 101,000 employees worldwide. Founded in 1864 in Halifax, Nova Scotia, it maintains its corporate headquarters in Toronto and its head office in Montreal. RBC's institution number is 003. In November 2017, RBC was added to the Financial Stability Board's list of global systemically important banks.

In Canada, the bank's personal and commercial banking operations are branded as RBC Royal Bank in English and RBC Banque Royale in French and serves approximately 11 million clients through its network of 1,263 branches. RBC Bank is a US banking subsidiary which formerly operated 439 branches across six states in the Southeastern United States, but now only offers cross-border banking services to Canadian travellers and expats. RBC's other Los Angeles-based US subsidiary City National Bank operates 79 branches across 11 US states. RBC also has 127 branches across seventeen countries in the Caribbean, which serve more than 16 million clients. RBC Capital Markets is RBC's worldwide investment and corporate banking subsidiary, while the investment brokerage firm is known as RBC Dominion Securities. Investment banking services are also provided through RBC Bank and the focus is on middle market clients. The company expanded further in 2024 when RBC acquired HSBC's Canadian operations.

In 2011, RBC was the largest Canadian company by revenue and market capitalization. In 2023, the company was ranked 38th in the Forbes Global 2000. The company has operations in Canada and 28 other countries, and had CA$1.574 trillion of assets under management in 2025.

== History ==
In 1864, the Merchants Bank of Halifax was founded in Halifax, Nova Scotia, as a commercial bank that financed the fishing and timber industries and the European and Caribbean import/export businesses. By 1869 the Merchants' Bank was officially incorporated and received its federal charter in the same year. During the 1870s and 1880s, the bank expanded into the other Maritime Provinces. When both the Newfoundland Commercial Bank and Union Bank of Newfoundland collapsed on December 10, 1894, the Merchants Bank expanded to Newfoundland on January 31, 1895.

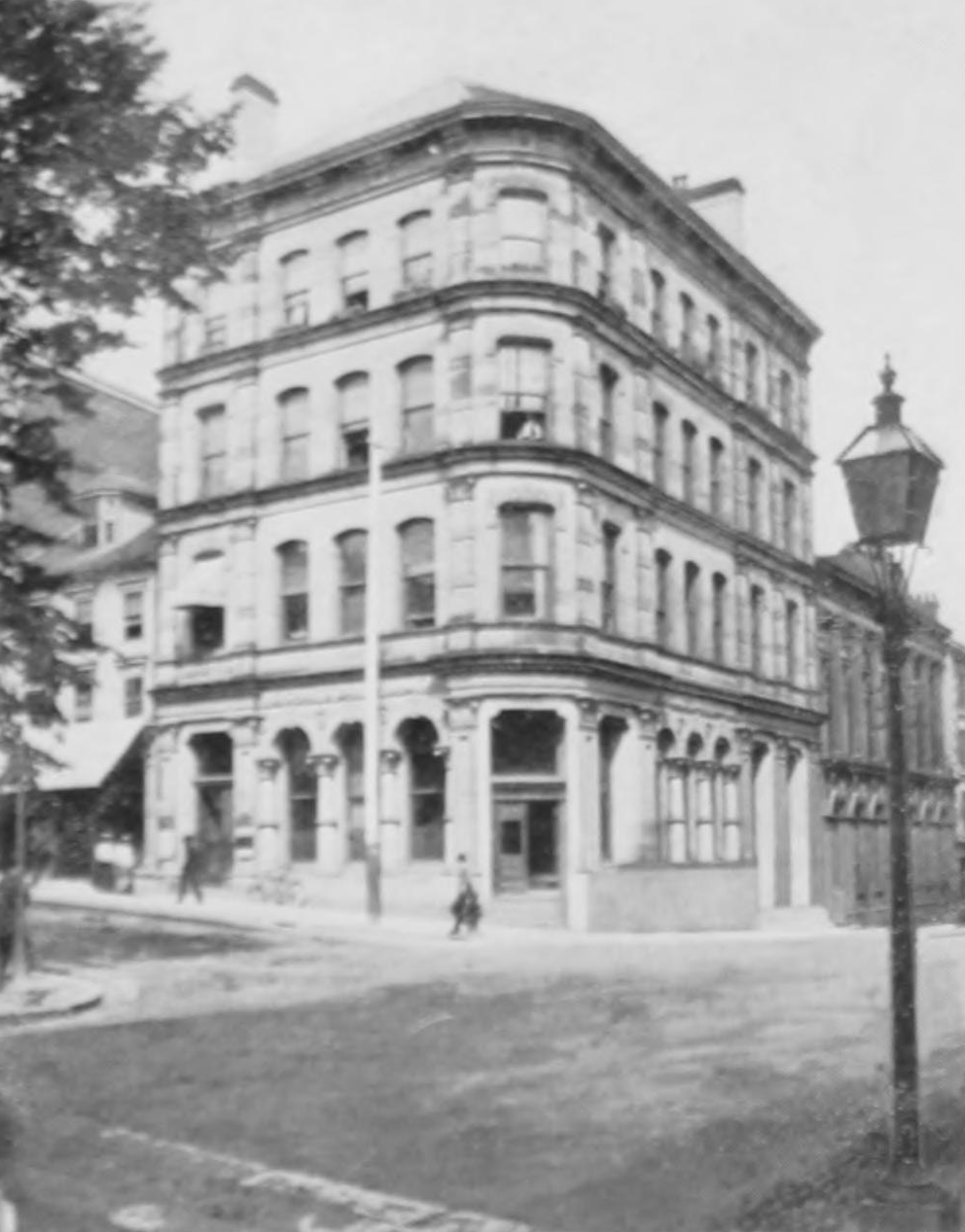
The Merchants' Bank of Halifax constructed its first building of its own in 1879 at the corner of Hollis and George. It was designed by Thomas Reed Jackson.

As the bank grew, executives changed its name to reflect its growth and western expansion. In 1901, the Merchants Bank of Halifax changed its name to the Royal Bank of Canada (RBC). As Canada’s financial activity became increasingly concentrated in Montreal, RBC moved its head office from Halifax to Montreal in 1907. In 1910, RBC merged with the Union Bank of Halifax. In the same year it built a bank branch in Winnipeg, Manitoba, designed by Carrère and Hastings, in beaux-arts classicism proclaiming the financial dominance of Winnipeg in the prairies. To improve its position in Ontario, RBC merged with Traders Bank of Canada in 1912 and in 1917 RBC merged with Quebec Bank, which was founded in 1818 and chartered in 1822 in Quebec City.

RBC's presence in Manitoba and Saskatchewan was strengthened through a 1918 merger with Northern Crown Bank, the product of the 1908 merger of Northern Bank (established in 1905 in Winnipeg) and Crown Bank of Canada (1904), based in Ontario. RBC's presence in the Canadian Prairie was further expanded by the 1925 merger with the Union Bank of Canada, which had begun in Quebec City in 1865 as the Union Bank of Lower Canada, but changed its name in 1886. The Union Bank of Canada had moved its headquarters to Winnipeg in 1912, and had built a strong presence in the Prairies and opened the first bank in the Northwest Territories at Fort Smith in 1921.

In 1935, RBC merged with Crown Savings and Loan Co. merged with Industrial Mortgage & Trust Co.

RoyWest Banking Corporation was formed in Nassau, Bahamas in 1965, to undertake medium-term lending and trustee business in the British West Indies. Majority owned by seven firms, including RBC and Westminster Bank, sole ownership transferred to National Westminster Bank in 1987.

RBC installed its first computer in 1961, the IBM 1401, the first to do so in Canadian banking. In the 1960s, RBC Insurance was created. In 1968, it merged with Ontario Loan and Debenture Company (formerly Ontario Savings and Investment Society). RBC Insurance is the largest Canadian bank-owned insurance organization, with services to over five million people. It provides life, health, travel, home and auto and reinsurance products as well as creditor and business insurance services. The completion of Royal Bank Plaza in Toronto in 1976 saw the relocation of many critical head-office functions from Montreal, with Toronto serving as RBC's corporate headquarters ever since. In 1993, RBC merged with Royal Trust.

In 1998, RBC acquired Security First Network Bank in Atlanta—the first pure Internet bank. In the same year, the Royal Bank of Canada proposed to merge with the Bank of Montreal, at the same time as the Toronto-Dominion Bank proposed to merge with the Canadian Imperial Bank of Commerce. Both mergers were examined by the Competition Bureau of Canada, and ultimately rejected by Paul Martin, at the time the Finance Minister of Canada, and future Prime Minister.

In 2000, RBC merged merchant credit/debit card acquiring business with the Bank of Montreal's to form Moneris Solutions. In 2013, RBC completed the acquisition of the Canadian subsidiary of Ally Financial.

An RBC branch in The Glebe neighbourhood of Ottawa was firebombed in May 2010. The party responsible later identified themselves on Independent Media Center and threatened to make their presence at the upcoming 2010 G20 Toronto summit.

In November 2022, RBC and HSBC Canada announced a deal which would see RBC acquiring 100% of the common shares of HSBC Canada for an all-cash purchase price of $13.5 billion, a multiple of 9.4 times HSBC Canada's estimated 2024 earnings. Completion of the transaction is expected by late 2023, subject to regulatory approvals. In December 2023, RBC received approval from Finance Minister Chrystia Freeland to take over HSBC Bank in a deal. Conditions for the deal include that none of HSBC Canada's 4,000 employees will be laid off within six months of the closing date or two years for direct staff, and banking services will be provided at 33 HSBC branches for at least another four years. RBC will also provide $7 billion in financing for affordable housing developments in Canada.

=== International expansion ===
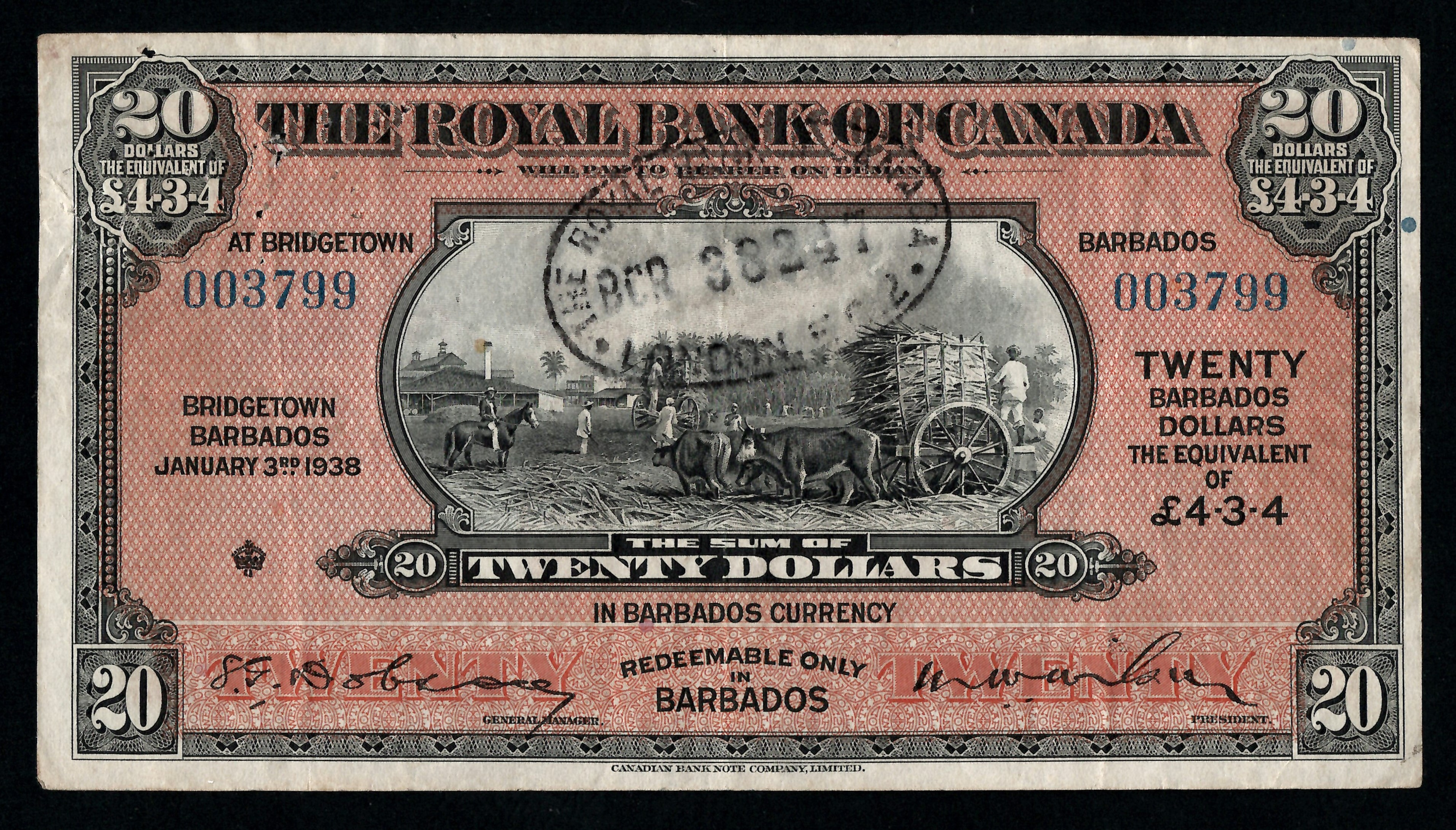
A $20 RBC banknote from 1938, issued for circulation in Barbados

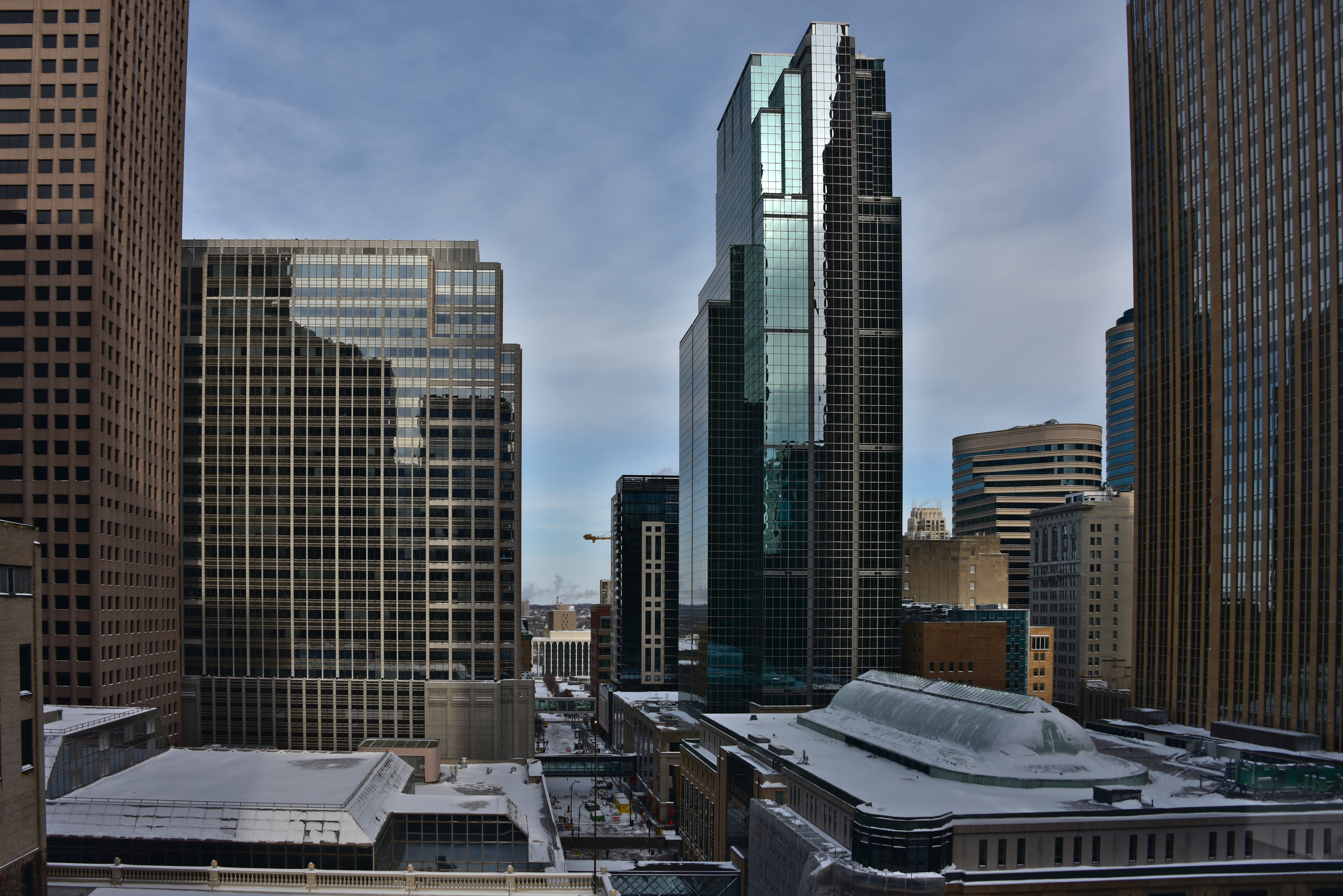
RBC Plaza in Minneapolis, headquarters for RBC Wealth Management, formerly Dain Rauscher Wessels, a firm acquired by RBC in 2000

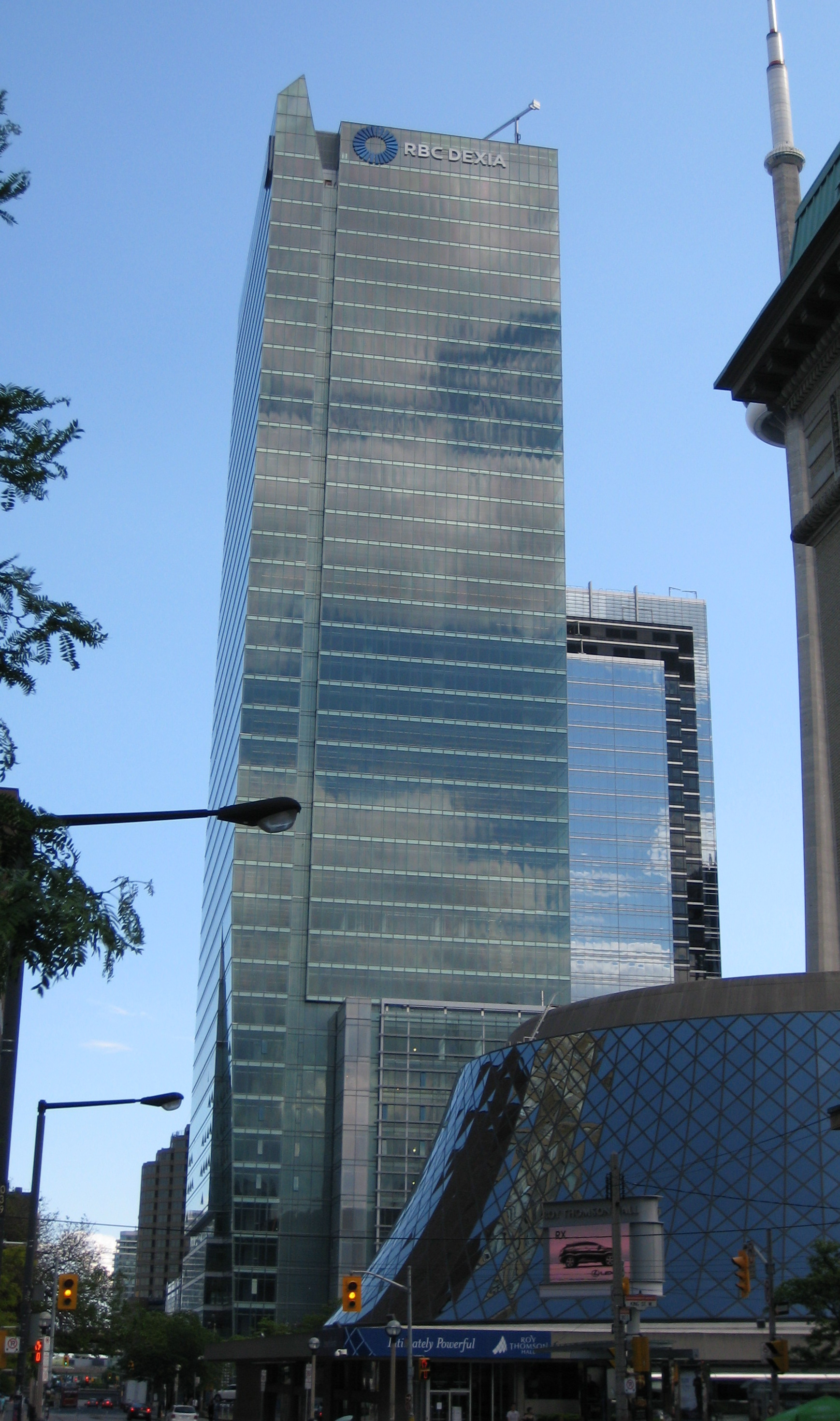
RBC Centre

- 1882: Merchants Bank of Halifax opened offices in Bermuda and Newfoundland.
- 1899: RBC opened an agency in New York City and a branch in Havana.
- 1903: RBC bought Banco de Oriente de Santiago de Cuba. By the mid-1920s, RBC had 65 branches in Cuba and is the largest bank in the country.
- 1904: RBC bought Banco del Commercio de Havana.
- 1907: RBC opened a branch in San Juan, Puerto Rico; branches in Mayagüez and Ponce followed.
- 1909: RBC established a branch in Nassau, Bahamas.
- 1910: RBC opened a branch in London and acquired branches in Puerto Rico and Port of Spain, Trinidad as a result of its acquisition of Union Bank of Halifax.
- 1911: RBC opened an agency in New York City, and branches in Bridgetown, Barbados, and Kingston, Jamaica.
- 1912: RBC bought Bank of British Honduras (incorporated in 1902 by United States citizens from Mobile) in British Honduras, which it converted to a branch.
  - RBC opened a branch in the Dominican Republic; three more follow.
- 1913: RBC opened a branch in Grenada.
- 1914: RBC bought out Bank of British Guiana (est. 1836), in British Guiana, and converted it to a branch.
- 1915: RBC opened branches in Costa Rica, Antigua, Dominica, and Saint Kitts.
- 1916: RBC opened a branch in Venezuela.
- 1917: RBC opened branches in Antigua, Dominica, St. Kitts, Montserrat, Nevis, and Tobago.
- 1918: RBC opened a branch in Barcelona, and another in Vladivostok that lasted less than a year.
- 1919: RBC opened branches in Brazil, Argentina, Uruguay, Paris, Martinique, Guadeloupe, and Port-au-Prince, Haiti.
- 1920: RBC opened a branch in Colombia and a branch in Castries, St Lucia.
- 1923: RBC bought and consolidated the banking operations of Pedro Gomez Mena e Hijo in Cuba.
- 1925: RBC opened a branch in Peru, and acquired the American-owned, and failed, Bank of Central and South America. The purchase of BCSA brought with it subsidiaries, and their branches, in Colombia, Costa Rica, Peru, and Venezuela
- 1932: RBC closed its branch in St. Lucia.
- 1940: RBC closed its branches in Martinique and Guadeloupe.
- 1958: A representative office opened in Hong Kong, which became a branch in 1978.
- 1959: RBC opened a branch in St. Vincent.
- 1960: RBC returned to St. Lucia.
- 1960: Fidel Castro's regime acquired RBC's operations in Cuba on December 8. At the time of the forced sale, RBC had 24 branches in Cuba. From 1961 to 1965, RBC maintained a Special Representative in Havana to facilitate trade between Cuba and Canada. After the failed Bay of Pigs Invasion in April 1961, the Special Representative acted as a financial intermediary between the American and Cuban governments to manage the ransoming of the prisoners for food and agricultural machinery.
- 1964: RBC opened a branch in George Town, Cayman Islands.
- 1970s: As a result of Law 75, RBC's operations in Colombia became Banco Royal Colombiano.
- 1973: RBC was forced to incorporate its operations in Jamaica, which became Royal Bank (Jamaica).
- 1980: RBC purchased Banco de San Juan in Puerto Rico, adding its 14 branches to the six that RBC already had in Puerto Rico. RBC sold its assets in Grenada to Republic Bank of Trinidad and Tobago.
- 1985: RBC started to withdraw from much of the Caribbean.
  - It sold its 12 branches in the Dominican Republic to Banco de Comercio Dominicano.
  - It also sold its stake in Royal Bank (Jamaica) to Jamaica Mutual Life Assurance. Branches in Curaçao, Aruba, St. Maarten and Dominica are still open (1985–present)
  - The Government of Guyana nationalized its operations there and renamed the bank the National Bank of Industry and Commerce Ltd.
  - Additionally, RBC incorporated its operations in Trinidad and Tobago locally, floating the shares, thereby divesting itself of ownership. The new bank took the name Royal Bank of Trinidad and Tobago (RBTT).
- 1986: National Mutual Royal Bank opened in Australia with RBC having a 50% shareholding
- 1986: RBC sold its two branches in Haiti to Societe Generale Haitienne de Banque, a local bank.
- 1987: RBC sold its operations in Belize, ex-British Honduras, to Belize Holdings Inc., which renamed them Belize Bank.
- 1990: National Mutual Royal Bank in Australia sold to the Australia and New Zealand Banking Group
- 1993: RBC sold Royal Bank of Puerto Rico to Spain's Banco Bilbao-Vizcaya.
- 1995: RBC sold Royal Trust Bank (Austria) to Anglo Irish Bank, which renamed it Anglo Irish Bank (Austria).
- 2000: Acquired Dain Rauscher Wessels, a US brokerage and investment banking firm based in Minneapolis, Minnesota
- 2001: RBC acquired Centura Bank based in Rocky Mount, North Carolina.
- 2001: RBC bought the investment banking and brokerage firm Tucker Anthony Sutro (Boston) from John Hancock Mutual Life Insurance Co.
- 2003: RBC purchased Florida interest in Provident Financial Group, Cincinnati OH.
- 2003: Hong Kong branch started operating as a licensed bank.
- 2006: RBC upgraded its representative office in Beijing, China, to a branch.
- 2006: Created an institutional investment joint venture with Dexia. The 50/50 partnership operated under the name RBC Dexia Investor Services.
- 2007: RBC acquires Carlin Financial.
- 2008: RBC established a representative office in Mumbai, India. RBC re-acquired 98.14% of the shares of Royal Bank of Trinidad and Tobago. This brought RBC back to Trinidad and Tobago 20 years after it had withdrawn and provided it with a presence in other islands served by RBTT.
- 2011: RBC sold RBC Bank to PNC Financial Services for US$3.62 billion. PNC ATMs are now used by customers with RBC Bank (Georgia), N.A. providing Canadians with bank options when they are residing in the US.
- 2012: RBC completed the acquisition of Dexia's 50% stake in RBC Dexia Investor Services Limited, making it the sole owner of the newly named [RBC Investor & Treasury Services]. RBC also opened a Branch in Wilemstad, Curaçao.
- 2014: RBC "entered into a merger agreement to acquire City National Corporation", a major U. S. bank.
- 2015: RBC agreed to sell its Swiss private bank Royal Bank of Canada (Suisse) SA to local rival SYZ Group. Terms of the sale were not disclosed. Royal Bank of Canada (Suisse) manages CHF 10 billion (US$10.5 billion, C$13.4 billion) of assets for clients in Africa, the Middle East and South America.
- 2015: RBC completed the acquisition of City National Bank (November)
- 2016: On January 21, 2016, Aviva announced the acquisition of RBC General Insurance Company, for C$582 million.
- 2019: RBC agreed to sell its Eastern Caribbean banking operations, in places such as Antigua, Dominica, and Saint Lucia, to a consortium of banks in the region.
- 2022: RBC announced the acquisition of wealth manager Brewin Dolphin in the United Kingdom, in a deal which valued Brewin Dolphin at C$2.4bn (£1.6bn).
- 2024 RBC completed the acquisition of HSBC Canada, splitting some assets with the National Bank for competition issues.

== Branding ==
=== Logo ===
Logo used by RBC from 1979 to 2001, designed by Gottschalk + Ash.

The bank's first modern identity was designed by firm Lippincott & Margulies, and was introduced in January 1962. From this point forward the bank's logo has contained the same basic element of a stylized lion clutching a globe, becoming more simplified with each iteration. Alongside promotion of the Royal Bank Plaza, a tweaked version of the mark by Montreal design consultancy Gottschalk + Ash silently debuted in June 1979. The same basic form was retained, however many lines were thickened and details simplified to facilitate printing at small sizes. The total brand overhaul and shortening of the Royal Bank name to RBC in August 2001 coincided with their expansion into the United States market. The direction of the lion, now further simplified, was reversed, the crown above omitted, and both the symbol and wordmark were placed within a blue shield.

=== Sponsorship ===
RBC sponsors cultural events including the Toronto International Film Festival. It also sponsors the RBC Taylor Prize, a literary award for non-fiction writing in Canada, and hosts a yearly Canadian Women Entrepreneur Award. In July 2013, the RBC Foundation partnered with the University of Toronto to revive the Siminovitch Prize in Theatre, given to recognize achievement in Canadian theatre.

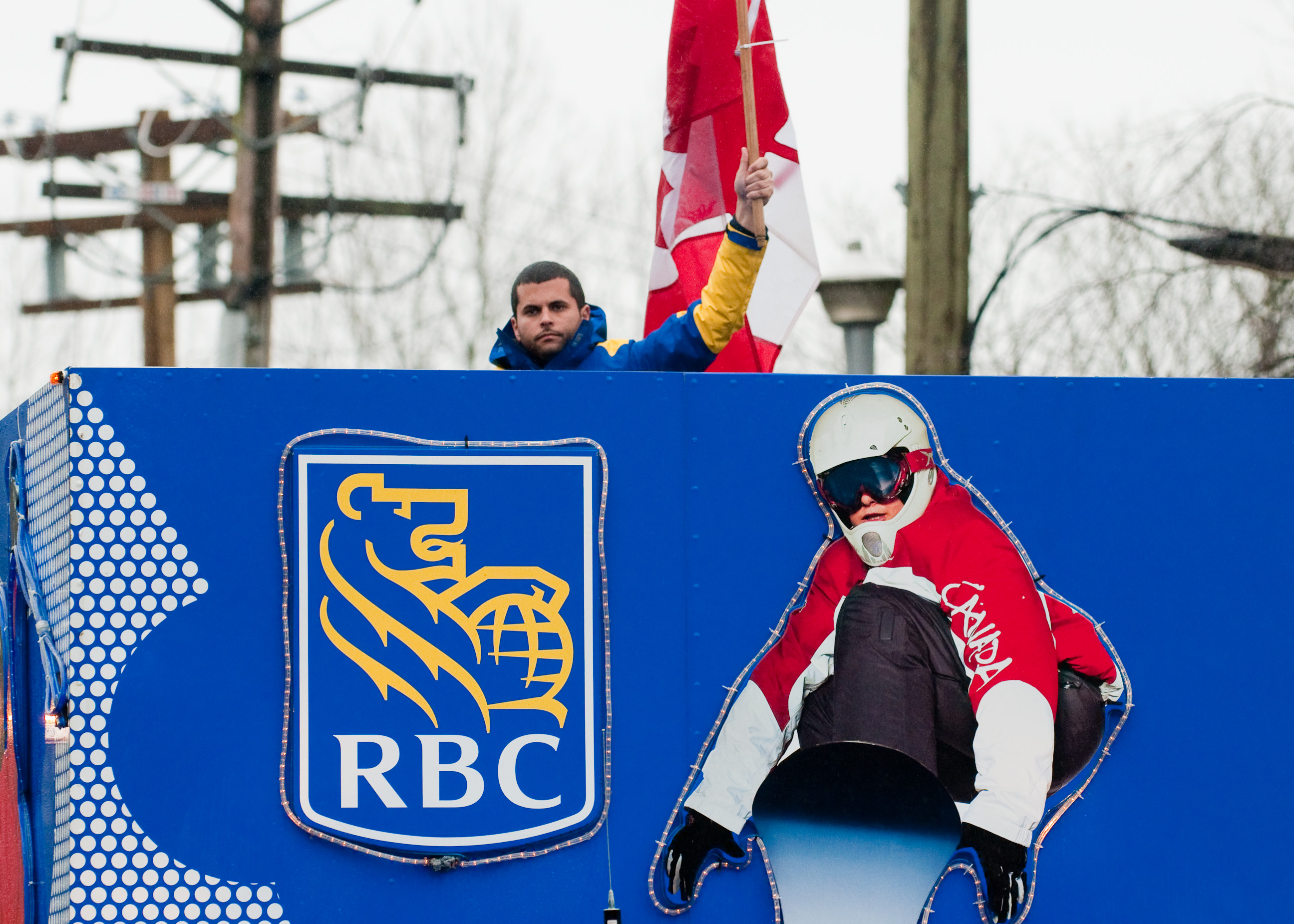
An RBC logo at the 2010 Winter Olympics

RBC is one of Canada's largest sponsors of amateur sports and is the longest-running Canadian sponsor of the Olympic Games. It employs dozens of top-tier amateur athletes as part-time spokespeople through the RBC Olympians program. RBC is a former premier sponsor of Hockey Canada and previously owned the naming rights to the National Junior A Championship, then called the Royal Bank Cup (later the RBC Cup). In addition, it supports Canadian hockey at the grassroots level through the RBC Play Hockey program.

RBC owns naming rights to the RBC Centre, RBC Convention Centre Winnipeg, RBC Canadian Open, and RBC Heritage (formerly the Heritage Classic). From 2002 to 2012, RBC previously held the naming rights to what is now the Lenovo Center in Raleigh, North Carolina.

RBC has owned naming rights for the Top 25 Canadian Immigrants Award, presented annually by Canadian Immigrant, since 2013.

RBC has also sponsored Major League Soccer in the United States since 2023. In 2025, RBC and its Los Angeles-based subsidiary City National Bank signed with the LA Galaxy to have its logo placed on the team's jersey sleeve and throughout the stadium.

== Head offices ==
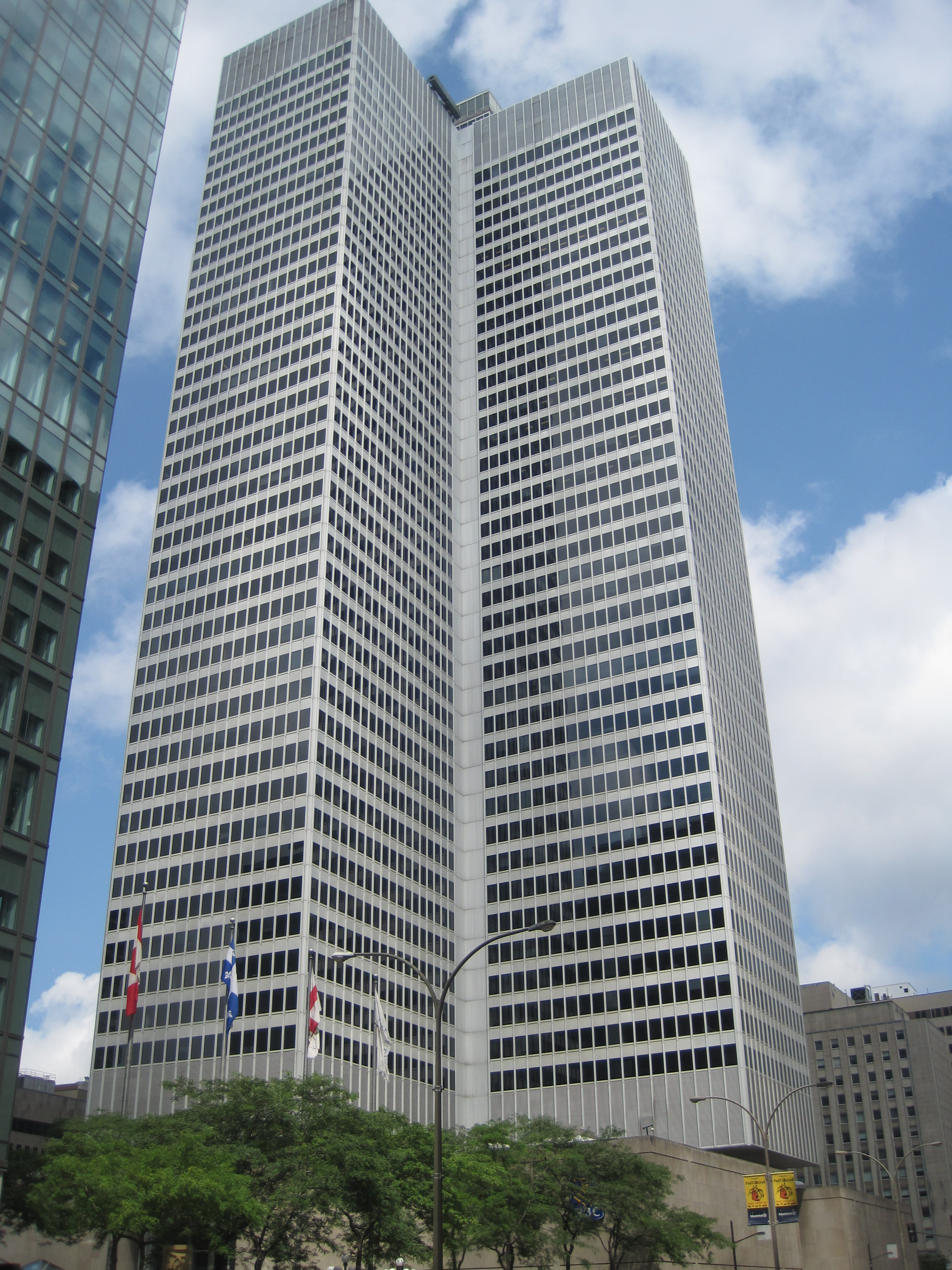
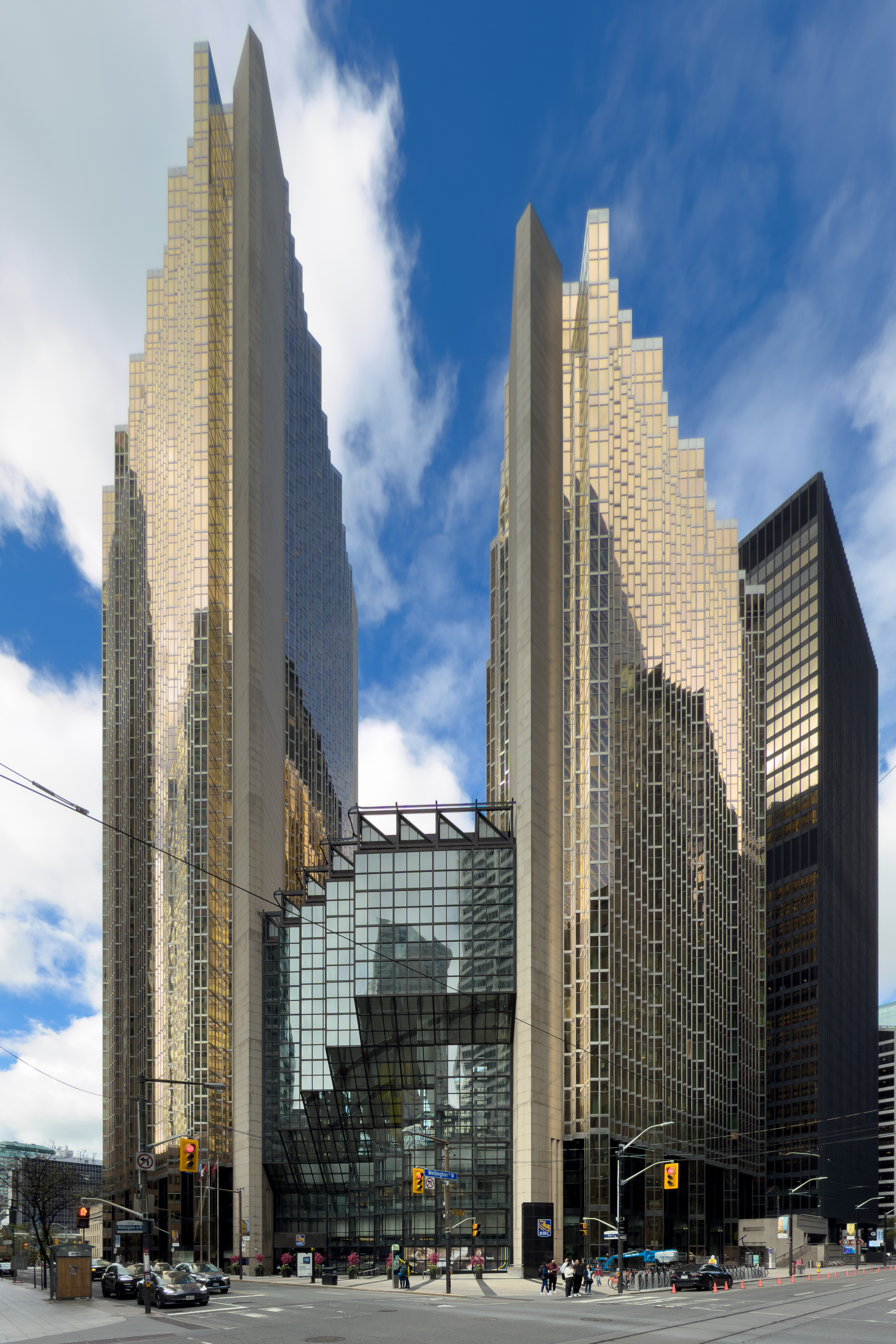
Place Ville Marie, Montreal (left) serves as the official head office for RBC, whereas Royal Bank Plaza, Toronto (right) serves as the bank's corporate headquarters.

The head office for the institution was initially located at the Merchants' Bank of Halifax Building, on Bedford Row, Halifax, Nova Scotia. The building served as the head office for the bank from 1864 to 1907. In 1907, the RBC relocated its head office to the Four Pillars Building, at 147 Saint Jacques Street (renumbered 221 in 1928), Montreal. The building was used as RBC's head office until 1928. The Four Pillars Building was later demolished, with only its facade remaining. In 1928, RBC moved its head office to the Old Royal Bank Building, at 360 Saint Jacques Street, Montreal.

In 1962, RBC moved its head office to Place Ville-Marie, at University Street and René-Lévesque Boulevard in Montreal. In 1976, RBC moved its corporate headquarters to Royal Bank Plaza to 200 Bay Street in Toronto, although Place Ville-Marie remained its registered head office under the Bank Act. RBC makes the distinction that Royal Bank Plaza in Toronto is its corporate headquarters, while Place Ville-Marie in Montreal is its head office.

== Controversies ==
=== Discrimination ===
On January 15, 2007, CBC Radio reported RBC was "refusing" to open US dollar accounts for people of certain nationalities. Canadian citizens with dual citizenship in Cuba, Iran, Iraq, Myanmar, North Korea or Sudan (mostly countries with US sanctions) were affected. The US Treasury Department restricts certain foreign nationals from using the US dollar payment system to limit terrorism and money laundering after the September 11, 2001, attacks. RBC replied that compliance with such laws does not represent an endorsement by the bank and on January 17, clarified its position on the application of the US laws, specifying that "with some exceptions" it does open accounts for dual citizens of the sanctioned countries. There have also been reports that the bank had closed the accounts of some Iranian-Canadian citizens.

=== Environment ===
According to a report by Rainforest Action Network, RBC's financing of oil sands bitumen extraction and expansion amounted to "more than $2.3 billion in loans and financing [of] more than $6.9 billion in [corporate] debt between 2003 and 2007 for 13 companies including: Encana, Husky Energy, OPTI Canada, Delphi Energy, Canadian Oil Sands Trust, Northwest Upgrading, Suncor, TotalEnergies, Connacher Oil and Gas, InterPipeline and Enbridge".

A 2020 report on fossil fuel finance by the Sierra Club and Rainforest Action Network found that RBC was the fifth largest funder of fossil fuels in the world, and largest in Canada, investing over US$160 billion on fossil fuel projects since the Paris Agreement in 2015. This sparked criticism from environmental groups and climate activists.

A more recent 2023 report from a coalition of environmental group places RBC as the largest financier of fossil fuel in the world in 2022, investing US$42 billion in fossil fuel projects in that year alone.

=== Funding of SCO litigation on Linux ===
RBC invested in SCO Group during the series of court cases seeking to collect royalties from the users of Linux.

=== Investor protection ===
In 2014, the Commodity Futures Trading Commission fined RBC $35,000,000 for engaging in more than 1,000 wash sales, fictitious sales, and other non-competitive practices over a three-year period.

=== Mismarking ===
In 2007, the Royal Bank of Canada fired several traders in its corporate bond business, after another trader accused them of mismarking bonds the bank held by overpricing them, and marked down the values of the bonds and recognized $13 million of trading losses relating to the bonds. The bank said it investigated the accusations, and took remedial action. The Globe and Mail noted: "traders might have an incentive to boost [the bonds'] prices because it could have an impact on their bonuses."

=== Temporary foreign workers and Canadian layoffs ===
In April 2013, the CBC reported that the Royal Bank of Canada was indirectly hiring temporary foreign workers to replace 45 Canadian information technology workers.

The CBC reported on May 7, 2013, that, during Question Period in Parliament, the NDP leveled accusations against the government and then Prime Minister Stephen Harper. Harper responded that the government has been working on problems with the Temporary Foreign Worker Program for more than a year.

=== Vacation pay class action lawsuit ===
On December 29, 2022, the Supreme Court of Ontario certified a class action lawsuit permitting employees of RBC Dominion Securities to seek $800 million in damages, over alleged unpaid wages for holidays and other vacation days.

== Memberships ==
RBC is a member of the Canadian Bankers Association which includes Canada's Big Five banks, and is a registered member with the Canada Deposit Insurance Corporation, a federal agency insuring deposits at all of Canada's chartered banks.

It is also a member of:

- CarIFS ATM Network (Defunct 2020)
- Interac
- Mastercard (in Canadian and Caribbean markets)
- NYCE point of sale Network
- Plus Network
- Global Banking Alliance for Women

== Leadership ==
The office of chairman of the Board was created in October 1949 for outgoing president Sydney Dobson. Until 2001, the chairmanship was given to the current or former president. After John Cleghorn's retirement in 2001, the chairmanship was made a separate, non-executive position.

=== President ===
1. James W. Merkel, 1864–1869
2. Thomas Clifford Kinnear, 1869–1870
3. Thomas Edward Kenny, 1870–1908
4. Herbert Samuel Holt, 1908–1934
5. Morris Watson Wilson, 1934 – 13 May 1946
6. Sydney George Dobson, 4 June 1946 – 18 October 1949
7. James Muir, 18 October 1949 – 10 April 1960
8. Madison Melville Walter, 26 April 1960 – 9 December 1960
9. William Earle McLaughlin, 19 December 1960– 30 June 1977
10. Rowland Cardwell Frazee 1 July 1977 – 30 September 1980
11. Jock Kinghorn Finlayson, 1 October 1980 – 31 May 1983
12. Allan Richard Taylor, 1 June 1983 – 31 May 1986
13. John Edward Cleghorn, 1 June 1986 – 30 March 2001
14. Gordon Melbourne Nixon, 1 April 2001 – 31 July 2014
15. David Ian McKay 1 August 2014 –

=== Chairman of the Board ===
1. Sydney George Dobson, 18 October 1949 – 30 November 1954
2. James Muir, 1 December 1954 – 10 April 1960
3. Madison Melville Walter, 26 April 1960 – 9 December 1960
4. William Earle McLaughlin, 1962 – 30 September 1980
5. Rowland Cardwell Frazee, 1 October 1980 – 31 May 1986
6. Allan Richard Taylor, 1 June 1986 – 26 January 1995
7. John Edward Cleghorn, 26 January 1995 – 31 July 2001
8. Guy Saint-Pierre, 1 August 2001 – 27 February 2004
9. David Peter O'Brien, 27 February 2004 – 31 December 2013
10. Kathleen Patricia Taylor, 1 January 2014 – 5 April 2023
11. Jacynthe Côté, 5 April 2023 –

== Awards ==
- 2025 - "Customer Service Excellence", "Recommended to Friends or Family (Net Promoter Score", "Financial Planning & Advice", "ATM Banking Excellence", "Online Banking Excellence", Ipsos 2025 Financial Service Excellence Awards
- 2025 - Ranked highest in customer satisfaction, J.D. Power 2025 Canada Retail Banking Advice Satisfaction Study
- 2025 - Canada's Best Investment Bank, Euromoney Awards for Excellence, 2025
- 2025 - North America's Best Bank for Research, Euromoney Awards for Excellence, 2025
- 2025 - "Most Valuable Canadian Brand 2025", Kantar BrandZ
- 2024 – RBC Dominion Securities, the highest-ranked bank-owned investment dealer in Canada, Investment Executive 2024 Brokerage Report Card
- 2024 – "Best Bank in Canada for Small and Medium-Sized Business", Global Finance

== Operating Units ==
RBC has six divisions:

- Personal Banking offers a range of banking and financial services to individuals and businesses across Canada, such as mortgages, loans, credit cards and bank and investment accounts.
- Commercial Banking works with small to medium-sized businesses and large enterprises to deliver a variety of banking and commercial finance services, including bank accounts, loans, lines of credit and equipment financing. Its RBCx platform supports company founders and venture capital firms in the innovation economy with a wide range of financial services.
- Wealth Management provides a variety of financial advisory services to its clients, including wealth, estate and retirement planning, business succession planning, private banking and philanthropic assistance. In September 2022, RBC acquired Brewin Dolphin, one of the U.K.'s largest wealth management firms.
- Capital Markets is a global investment bank providing services in banking, finance, and capital markets to corporations, institutional investors, asset managers, and governments globally.
- Insurance offers a range of personal and business-related insurance products, including health, home, auto, travel, wealth, and reinsurance advice and solutions. It also offers creditor and business insurance services to individual, business, and group clients.
- Investor and Treasury Services (I&TS) provides custodial, advisory, financing, and other services to safeguard clients' assets, while also maximizing liquidity and managing risk. RBC Borealis, a division of I&TS, conducts finance-focused AI research and develops AI models for financial services.

== Bank histories ==
- McDowall, Duncan. Quick to the Frontier: Canada's Royal Bank. McClelland & Stewart, 1993.
- Royal Bank of Canada. Fiftieth Anniversary of the Royal Bank of Canada: A Record of Its Progress during the Past Half Century. Royal Bank of Canada, 1920.

== See also ==
- Big Five (banks)
- List of banks and credit unions in Canada
- List of banks in the Americas
- List of investors in Bernard L. Madoff Investment Securities
- List of largest banks

== Works cited ==
- McDowall, Duncan (1993). Quick to the Frontier: Canada's Royal Bank. Toronto: McClelland & Stewart. ISBN 978-0771055041.
