= Arthur Blaikie Purvis =

British industrialist (1890–1941)

- Born: 31 March 1890; London, England
- Died: 14 August 1941 (aged 51); RAF Heathfield, Scotland
- Spouse(s): Louise Metcalf Gifford (m. 1915; died 1916) Margaret Jones (m. 1918)

Arthur Blaikie Purvis PC (31 March 1890 – 14 August 1941) was a British industrialist who coordinated British war purchases in North America during the Second World War.

== Life and career ==
Purvis was born in London to a Scottish father and was educated at the Tottenham Grammar School. During the First World War, Purvis was responsible for the purchase of materials for explosives in America. After the War, he moved to Canada to head Canadian Industries Limited. In 1936, he was appointed by William Lyon Mackenzie King to chair the National Employment Commission.

On the outbreak of the Second World War, Purvis was appointed by the British government to be director-general of the British Purchasing Commission, which was charged with buying war supplies from the United States. He was also chairman of the Anglo-French Purchasing Board, where he worked alongside Jean Monnet. In June 1940, when France was on the verge of concluding an armistice with Germany, Purvis arranged to take over all the pending French weapons contracts in the United States at the cost of $612 million. Purvis negotiated for the British during September 1940 to secure items like torpedo-boats, aircraft and munitions that the United States would provide the British in addition to the 50 destroyers as part of the Destroyers for Bases Agreement.

In 1941, he was made chairman of the British Supply Council in North America, having overall responsibility over all British war purchases in the United States. Purvis worked closely with Treasury Secretary Henry Morgenthau Jr., "almost as closely together as two Ministers in the same Cabinet." He was killed in an air crash on 14 August 1941, when his plane crashed shortly after taking off from RAF Heathfield in Scotland. He was succeeded as chairman of the BSC by Morris Wilson.

Purvis' contemporaries held him in high regard: Henry Morgenthau Jr. wrote that Purvis was "the ablest British representative in Washington but one of the rarest persons I have ever known", while Jean Monnet wrote that he "served the Allied war effort magnificently until his death". On his death, Winston Churchill wrote that "Purvis was a grievous loss, as he held so many British, American, and Canadian threads in his hands". He was succeeded as head of the British Supply Council by Morris Wilson.

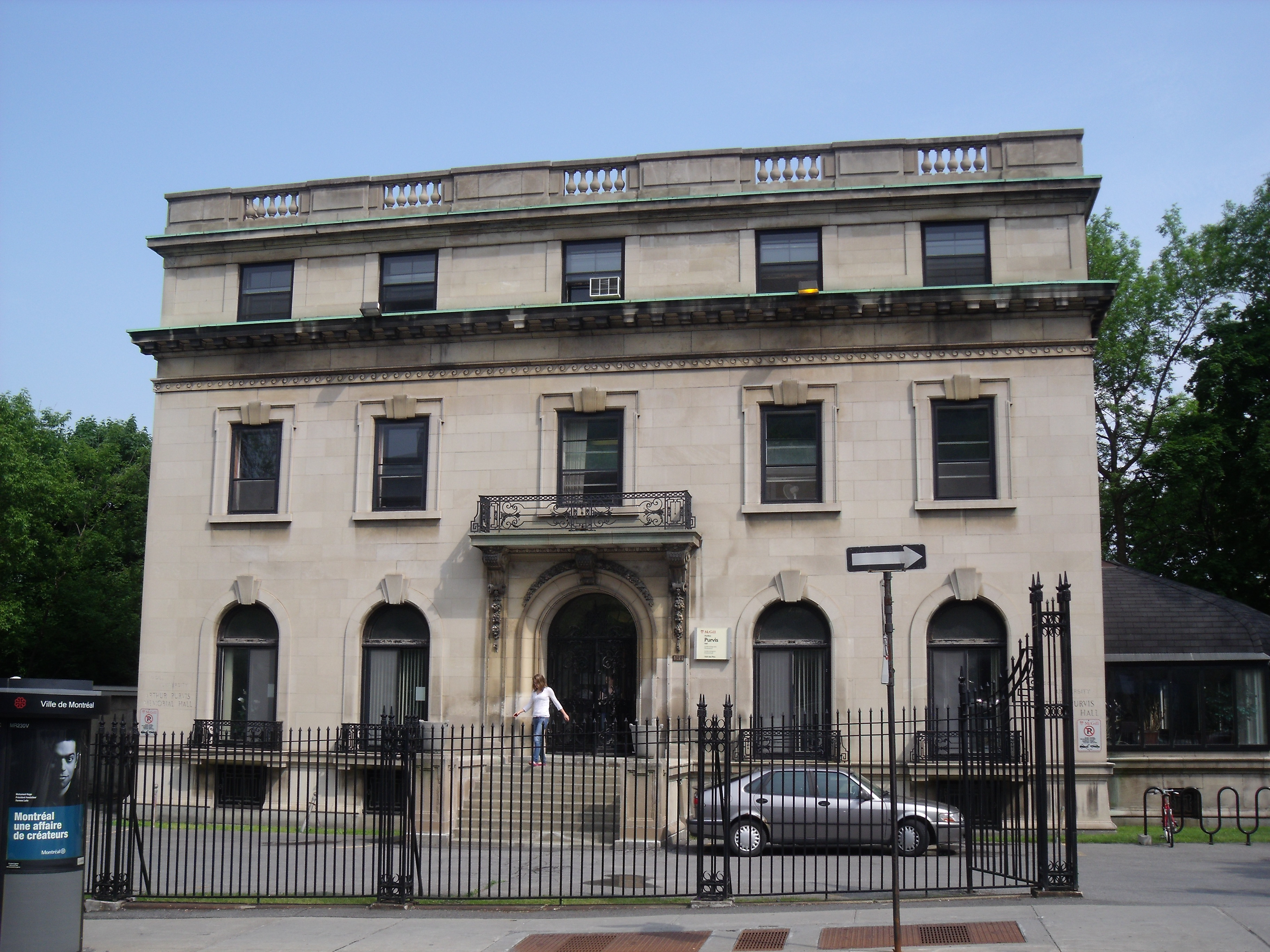
Purvis Hall, 1020 avenue des Pins Ouest, Montreal, Quebec, McGill University Campus.

Purvis was made a Privy Counsellor in 1940, but was killed before he could be sworn in. Purvis Hall at McGill University is named after him.
