= James Muir =

Scottish-Canadian banker

- Born: 11 November 1891; Peebles, Peeblesshire
- Died: 10 April 1960 (aged 68); Peebles, Peeblesshire
- Spouse: Phyllis Marguerite Brayley (m. 1919)

James Muir (11 November 1891 – 10 April 1960) was a Scottish-Canadian banker who was president of the Royal Bank of Canada (RBC) from 1949 to 1960.

== Early life and education ==
James Muir was born on 11 November 1891 in Scotland to William Muir and Jane Clark. He received his early education in a one-room school, and then later in the Peebles, Scottish Borders high school. In 1907, he left school to work for the Commercial Bank of Scotland.

== Career ==
In January 1911, Muir emigrated to Canada to work for the Royal Bank of Canada. In 1945, Muir assumed the role of general manager of the Royal Bank of Canada. Four years later, in 1949, he replaced Sydney Dobson as president.

During his tenure as president of the Royal Bank of Canada, the bank's performance increased. By 1958, the bank held 38% of all Canadian mortgages. Under Muir's tenure, the bank held approximately 25% of the Canadian banking industry by 1960.

Muir maintained professional relationships with politicians, bankers, and corporate attorneys, such as Quebec's premier Maurice Duplessis, Canadian prime minister Louis St. Laurent, Canadian cabinet minister C. D. Howe, bankers such as Graham Towers, and corporate attorneys like Lazarus Phillips.

== Philanthropy ==
In 1954, Muir was named Honorary Chief of the Blood Band of the Blackfoot Indian Confederacy in honor of his leadership and humanitarianism.

== Personal life and death ==
In 1919, Muir married Phyllis Marguerite Brayley.

On 10 April 1960, he died of a massive heart attack while driving in Scotland. He is buried at Mount Royal Cemetery in Montreal.
