= Jock K. Finlayson =

Canadian banker (1921–2003)

- Born: 27 May 1921; Nanaimo, British Columbia
- Died: 12 November 2003 (aged 82); Sherbrooke, Quebec
- Spouse(s): Jean Clancy Clark (m. 1947) Madeleine Coussement (m. 1976)
- Military career
- Allegiance: Canada
- Branch: Canadian Army; Royal Canadian Air Force
- Service years: 1942–43 (Army); 1943–45 (Air Force)
- Conflicts: World War II

Jock Kinghorn Finlayson (27 May 1921 – 12 November 2003) was a Canadian banker who served from 1980 to 1983 as president of the Royal Bank of Canada.

== Early life ==
Jock Kinghorn Finlayson was born on 27 May 1921 in Nanaimo, British Columbia to John Archibald Finlayson and Elizabeth Lister. He had three brothers: William, Deane, and Archie.

== Career ==
Finlayson joined the Royal Bank of Canada in 1939 in Nanaimo. He worked for the bank for three years before joining the Canadian Army 1942. The following year, he transferred to the Royal Canadian Air Force, where he ended the war as a pilot navigator.

== Personal life ==
On Friday, 7 November 1947, Finlayson married Jean Clancy Clark (1917–1999) at St James the Apostle in Montreal. They had one daughter, Janet Betty. The couple divorced in 1975, and on 7 January 1976, he remarried to Madeleine Victoria Coussement (1924–2014). Finlayson died at the Centre hospitalier universitaire de Sherbrooke on 12 November 2003 at age 82. The funeral was held on 19 November at St. Patrick's Basilica in Montreal.
