= David I. McKay =

Canadian banker

- Born: February 1965 (age 61); Montreal, Quebec
- Education: University of Waterloo (BMath); University of Western Ontario (MBA)
- Spouse: Karen McKay

David Ian McKay OOnt (born February 1965) is a Canadian banking executive. He is the president and CEO of the Royal Bank of Canada (RBC), one of Canada's largest banks and one of the largest banks in the world by market capitalization. He is both a member board director at the Business Council of Canada, and serves on the Catalyst Canada Advisory Board. McKay also serves as the chair of the Business/Higher Education Roundtable.

== Early life ==
McKay was born in Montreal, Quebec, where he grew up. His father was an entrepreneur and small business owner.

McKay holds a Bachelor of Mathematics degree and an honorary Doctor of Mathematics degree from the University of Waterloo. He also holds a Master of Business Administration degree and an honorary Doctor of Laws degree from the Richard Ivey School of Business at the University of Western Ontario, and an honorary degree from Toronto Metropolitan University.

== Career ==
McKay joined RBC in 1983 as a co-op student in computer programming before moving to the organization's retail banking arm. After completing his master's degree in 1992, he returned to RBC, working in progressively senior roles in Canada and Japan in retail and business banking, group risk management, and corporate banking.

McKay was senior vice president of Financing Products, then executive vice president of Personal Financial Services. McKay went on to lead RBC's retail banking portfolio, first as group head of Canadian Banking (2008–12) and most recently as group head of Personal and Commercial Banking worldwide (2012–14). During this time, McKay contributed to the growth of RBC's retail banking business, helping the bank attain top market positions in all the division's product categories. Recognizing the need to invest in innovation and technology to evolve with changing customer needs, McKay also oversaw RBC's move into the payments space.

McKay was appointed president of RBC on February 26, 2014 and chief executive officer and director of the Board on August 1, 2014, succeeding Gord Nixon in these roles.

Shortly after being appointed president and CEO in 2014, he led the acquisition of City National Corporation, creating a platform for growth with institutional, corporate and high net worth clients in the U.S.

McKay supported and developed RBC "Future Launch" program, a 10-year, $500 million charity program to help youth.

Most recently, under his leadership in 2019, the RBC Climate Blueprint committed to $100 billion in sustainable financing by 2025. The following year, RBC became the first Canadian bank to sign a long-term power purchase agreement for renewable energy.

=== Honours and awards ===
In 2012, he received the "Retail Banker of the Year" Award by Retail Banker International, which recognizes excellence and leadership in retail banking.

In 2020, The Globe and Mail's Report on Business recognized Dave McKay as Corporate Citizen of the Year, one of Canada's top 5 CEOs. The same year, McKay was named the recipient of the 2020 Ivey Business Leader Award.

In October 2022, he was awarded the Ivey Business Leader of the Year award. Protesters outside the event criticized McKay in response to RBC's funding of the Coastal GasLink Pipeline on Wetʼsuwetʼen territory violating Indigenous sovereignty and the $260 billion Canadian dollars RBC has given to new fossil fuel projects.

In November 2022, he received the Order of Ontario. He was named Canada’s Outstanding CEO of the Year for 2022.

== See also ==
- List of University of Waterloo people
