= Frazee (surname) =

Frazee is a surname. Notable people with the surname include:

- Harry Frazee (1881–1929), American theatrical agent, producer and baseball team owner
- Jane Frazee, (1915-1985), American actress
- Jeff Frazee (born 1987), American ice hockey player
- Marla Frazee (b.orn 1958), American children's book author and illustrator
- Robert C. Frazee (1928–2009), American politician
- Rowland Frazee (1921–2007), Canadian banker
- Terry Frazee, special effects artist
