= W. Earle McLaughlin =

Canadian banker (1915–1991)

- Born: 16 September 1915; Oshawa, Ontario
- Died: 30 October 1991 (aged 76); Montreal, Quebec
- Education: Queen's University (BA 1936)
- Spouse: Ethel Wattie (m. 1940)

William Earle McLaughlin OC (16 September 1915 – 30 October 1991) was a Canadian banker who was the Chairman of the Royal Bank of Canada from 1960 to 1979.

Born in Oshawa, Ontario, to parents Frank McLaughlin and Frankie L. Houlden. Earle McLaughlin graduated with a gold medal in commerce from Queen's University and joined the Royal Bank of Canada in 1936. In 1960, at an age considered very young at the time, 45-year-old McLaughlin was appointed the bank's general manager and then shortly thereafter, president. He would retire as chairman in 1979.

In addition to the Royal Bank, McLaughlin served on the board of directors of a number of corporations including Canadian Pacific Railway, Algoma Steel, Metropolitan Life and General Motors (a board which he was appointed to after the retirement of Sam McLaughlin, his first cousin once removed). He was a member of the board of governors of the Royal Victoria Hospital and the Council of the Montreal Museum of Fine Arts.

Following his retirement from banking, he served as chancellor of Concordia University (1982–1986) and was a trustee of Queen's University who awarded him their alumni John B. Stirling Montreal Medal in 1967. Earle McLaughlin was made an Officer of the Order of Canada in 1981. McLaughlin died in Montreal in 1991 and was buried at Mount Royal Cemetery.

His grandson, Kevin McLaughlin, now continues the family automotive tradition with AutoShare.

== Works ==
McLaughlin, W. Earle. Collected Speeches 1961–1979. Royal Bank of Canada, 1980.
