= RAF Ferry Command =

Former command of the Royal Air Force

Royal Air Force Ferry Command
- Active: 20 July 1941–25 March 1943
- Country: United Kingdom
- Branch: Royal Air Force
- Type: Command
- Role: Aircraft delivery
- Engagements: World War II

RAF Ferry Command was the secretive Royal Air Force command formed on 20 July 1941 to ferry urgently needed aircraft from their place of manufacture in the United States and Canada, to the front line operational units in Britain, Europe, North Africa and the Middle East during the Second World War.

It was later subsumed into the new Transport Command on 25 March 1943 by being reduced to Group status.

== History ==
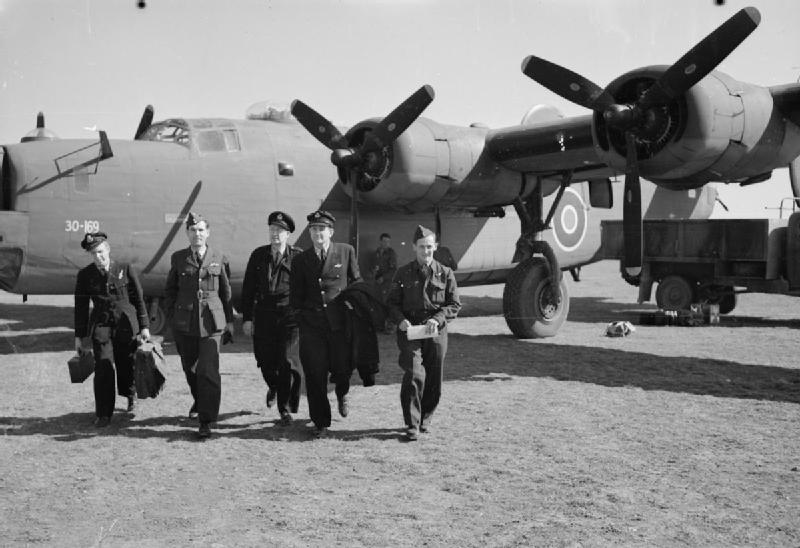
A mixed service and civilian crew of No. 45 Group RAF leave their Consolidated Liberator B Mark VI on arriving at Celone, Italy, after a ferry flight from Canada. Likely in the first months of 1944, as this is when 31 Squadron SAAF was re-equipping with Liberators.

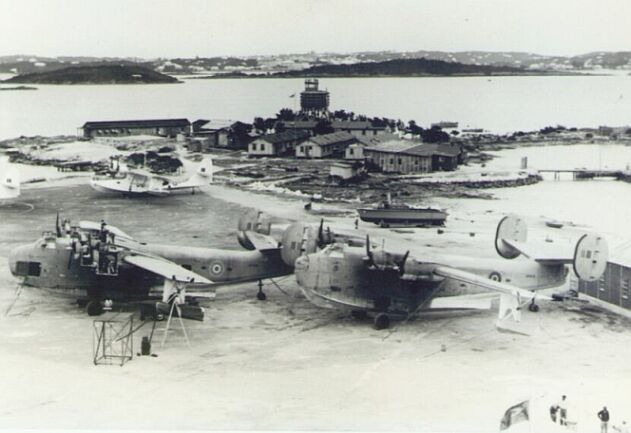
RAF Darrell's Island in the Imperial fortress of Bermuda during World War II. This base was used throughout the war for trans-Atlantic ferrying of flying boats such as the Catalinas to the rear of photo, which were flown there from United States factories to be tested prior to acceptance by the Air Ministry and delivery across the Atlantic. RAF Transport Command flights (such as those flown by the Coronados in the foreground) also utilised the airfield.

The practice of ferrying aircraft from US manufacturers to the UK was begun by the Ministry of Aircraft Production. Its minister, Lord Beaverbrook, a Canadian by origin, reached an agreement with Sir Edward Beatty, a friend and chairman of the Canadian Pacific Railway Company, to provide ground facilities and support. MAP would discreetly provide civilian crews and management. Previously, aircraft had been assembled, dismantled and then transported by ship across the Atlantic, and were subject to long delays and frequent attacks by German U-Boats.

Former RAF officer Don Bennett, a specialist in long-distance flying and later Air Vice Marshal and commander of the Pathfinder force, led the first test delivery formation flight in November 1940. The mission was so successful that by 1941, MAP took the operation out of the hands of CPR to put it under the Atlantic Ferry Organization ("Atfero") which was set up by Morris W. Wilson, a banker in Montreal. Wilson hired civilian pilots of widely different backgrounds and nationalities to fly the aircraft to the UK. Because the planes were now being flown on their own, each aircraft required specially trained navigators and radio operators. These crews were then brought back by ships in convoys. "Atfero hired the pilots, planned the routes, selected the airports [and] set up weather and radiocommunication stations."

Aircraft were first transported to Dorval Airport near Montreal, and then flown to RCAF Station Gander in Newfoundland for the trans-Atlantic flight. The organization was passed to Air Ministry administration, though retaining civilian pilots, some of whom were Americans, alongside RAF and RCAF pilots, navigators and radio operators. The crews were briefed by local meteorologists including R. E. Munn. After completing delivery, crews were eventually flown back to Canada, returning to Dorval for their next run.

Ferry Command was formed on 20 July 1941, by the raising of the RAF Atlantic Ferry Service to Command status. Its commander for its whole existence was Air Chief Marshal Sir Frederick Bowhill. Dorval, near Montreal, continued as its base of operations.

The main function of Ferry Command was the ferrying of new aircraft from factory to operational unit. Ferry Command originally did this over only one northern area of the world, rather than the more general routes that Transport Command later developed, including routes over the jungles of South America and Africa and the deserts of North Africa and the Middle East. Ferry Command's operational area was initially the North Atlantic, and its responsibility was to bring the larger aircraft that had the range to do the trip over the ocean, with the addition of extra fuel tanks, from American and Canadian factories to the RAF home commands.

This was pioneering work. Before Ferry Command, only about a hundred aircraft had attempted a North Atlantic crossing in good weather, and only about half had made it. Over the course of the war, more than 9,000 aircraft were individually ferried across the ocean and the aircraft played a significant role in the outcome of the war. This was accomplished without the use of radar by specially trained navigators who primarily used celestial methods.

=== Reduction in status to No. 45 Group ===
Ferry Command was subsumed into the new Transport Command on 25 March 1943 by being reduced to Group status as No 45 (Atlantic Ferry) Group. No. 45 Group RAF's main task was the ferrying of U.S. and Canadian built aircraft across the Atlantic. It also administered trans-Atlantic passenger and freight services. The group still retained responsibility for Atlantic aircraft ferrying operations, but Transport Command was a worldwide formation, rather than a single-mission command. Bowhill became the first commander of Transport Command.

On 8 September 1944, No. 231 Squadron RAF reformed at Dorval, Canada, from No. 45 Group Communications Squadron. The squadron's Coronado flying boats operated between North America, West Africa and the UK, using Largs on the Firth of Clyde as its British terminal. Other flights were flown with landplanes, using several of the types available to No. 45 Group as required. In September 1945 the squadron moved to Bermuda, where it disbanded on 15 January 1946.

In summer 1945, 45 Group included No. 112 (North Atlantic) Wing at Dorval, with 231 Squadron, 5 Aircraft Preparation Unit, 6 Ferry Unit all at Dorval; 6 APU at Bermuda; 313 Ferry Training Unit at North Bay; and RAF Station Reykjavik with the RAF Hospital there and No. 9 Mechanical Transport Company.

By the end of the war, crossing the Atlantic had become an almost routine operation, presaging the inauguration of scheduled commercial air transport services after the war.

== In media ==
Above and Beyond (2006), a Canadian Broadcasting Corporation (CBC) four-hour mini-series, was inspired by the true story of RAF Ferry Command, recounting the delivery of aircraft across the North Atlantic to the Royal Air Force. The film concludes with the departure of Don Bennett and the handover of control to RAF Command. The Lockheed Hudson is the primary aircraft portrayed in the mini-series, in the form of a real-life example alongside numerous CGI Hudsons.

== See also ==
- List of Royal Air Force commands
