= Morris Wilson =

Canadian banker

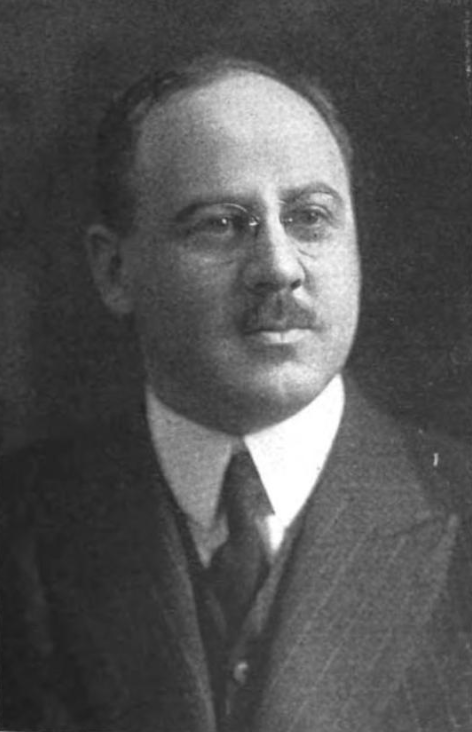

Personal details
- Born: Morris Watson Wilson; 1 March 1883 Lunenburg, Nova Scotia
- Died: 14 May 1946 (aged 63) Montreal, Quebec
- Occupation: Banker

Morris Watson Wilson, CMG (1 March 1883 – 14 May 1946) was a Canadian banker.

== Biography ==
Born in Lunenburg, Nova Scotia, Wilson was the president of the Royal Bank of Canada between 1934 and 1946, becoming the first professional banker to head the bank.

During World War II, Wilson was appointed vice-chairman of the British Supply Council in North America in 1941, and became its chairman after the death of chairman Arthur Blaikie Purvis in 1941. He was also the head of the Atlantic Ferry Organisation (ATFERO), the civilian precursor of the RAF Ferry Command, and the North American representative of the British Ministry of Aircraft Production. For his wartime services, he was appointed CMG in 1944.

Between 1943 and 1946 Wilson was the Chancellor of McGill University in succession to Sir Edward Beatty, having been a Governor since 1937. He served as Chancellor and president of the Royal Bank of Canada until his sudden death, of a heart attack, in 1946.
