= Rowland Frazee =

Canadian banker (1921–2007)

Rowland Frazee CC
- Born: 12 May 1921; Halifax, Nova Scotia
- Died: 29 July 2007 (aged 86); St. Andrews, New Brunswick
- Education: Dalhousie University (BCom 1948)
- Spouse: Marie Eileen Tait (m. 1949)
- Military career
- Allegiance: Canada
- Branch: Canadian Army
- Service years: 1941–1945
- Rank: Major
- Unit: Carleton and York Regiment
- Conflicts: World War II

Rowland Cardwell Frazee CC (12 May 1921 – 29 July 2007) was a Canadian banker, and chairman and chief executive officer of the Royal Bank of Canada from 1979 to 1986.

== Biography ==
Born in Halifax, Nova Scotia, at age five, the family moved to St. Stephen, New Brunswick where his father had been appointed bank manager. At age eighteen, Rowland Frazee went to work as a clerk at his father's branch but following the outbreak of World War II he enlisted in the Canadian Army in 1941 serving overseas with The Carleton and York Regiment, First Canadian Infantry Division, with whom he participated in the July 1943 allied landings in Sicily. Wounded on three occasions, Frazee distinguished himself in the Italian campaign and in northwest Europe. At the time of his decommissioning in 1945 he held the rank of Major.

After the war, Frazee studied at Dalhousie University in Halifax, where he graduated with a Bachelor of Commerce degree in 1948. Resuming his banking career, he rose to become the Royal Bank's president in 1977 and assumed the role of chairman and chief executive officer in 1980. He retired from the bank on May 31, 1986, but remained a member of the board of directors until 1992.

In 1985, he was made an Officer of the Order of Canada and was promoted to Companion in 1991. In 2001, he was inducted into the New Brunswick Business Hall of Fame.

His son, Stephen Frazee, is a successful Toronto real estate broker and his daughter, Catherine Frazee, a former chair of the Ontario Human Rights Commission, is a retired Professor of Distinction at the Toronto Metropolitan University School of Disability Studies.
