= Lawrence G. Greenwood =

Canadian banker (1921–2006)

- Born: 16 June 1921; Briercrest, Saskatchewan, Canada
- Died: 21 September 2006 (aged 85); Toronto, Ontario
- Education: Regina Central Collegiate ('38)
- Spouse: Margaret Purser (m. 1947)
- Military career
- Allegiance: Canada
- Branch: Royal Canadian Air Force
- Service years: 1941–1945
- Conflicts: World War II

Lawrence George Greenwood (16 June 1921 – 21 September 2006) was a Canadian banker who served from 1968 to 1971 as president of the Canadian Imperial Bank of Commerce.

Greenwood began his career in 1938 in Regina with the Canadian Bank of Commerce. After serving from 1941 to 1945 in the Royal Canadian Air Force, he resumed working for the bank. In 1953 he received his first managerial posting, and had promotions in 1956 and 1958. Following the merger of the Canadian Bank of Commerce and the Imperial Bank of Canada in 1961, in 1962 he was appointed to the head office of the new Canadian Imperial Bank of Commerce.

Greenwood rose through the executive ranks through the 1960s, and in 1968 became the bank's fourth president, succeeding William Masterton Currie. Greenwood served as president until 1971, when he became vice-chairman and was transferred to Montreal. He remained in this role until 1976, when he returned to Toronto as an executive vice-president. Greenwood retired from the bank in 1981. He died in Toronto in 2006 at age 85.

== Early life and education ==
Lawrence George Greenwood was born in Briercrest, Saskatchewan on 16 June 1921 to George Tuckfield Greenwood (1891–1947) and Mildred Rebecca Jane Clifford (1893–1963). He had three sisters: Thelma, Muriel, and June. Greenwood graduated high school from Regina Central Collegiate in 1938.

== Career ==
On 25 May 1938, Greenwood began working for the Canadian Bank of Commerce. He stayed with the bank until 1941, when he enlisted in the Royal Canadian Air Force. Greenwood remained with the air force until the end of the war, and served in North Africa and Europe.

Greenwood moved to Winnipeg in 1945 and resumed his employment with the bank. In 1953 he received his first managerial posting, as the assistant manager at a Toronto branch. This was followed by postings as the manager for the Seattle branch in 1956, then as a superintendent at the head office in Toronto in March 1958. In December 1958 he left the head office and became a manager of a branch in Toronto. On 1 June 1961, the Canadian Bank of Commerce merged with the Imperial Bank of Canada to form the Canadian Imperial Bank of Commerce, with whom Greenwood continued. In 1962, he was appointed assistant general manager at the bank's head office. The following year he was appointed regional general manager for international operations, and in July 1964 was made deputy chief general manager. In December 1964 he was appointed chief general manager, and in November 1967 was elected a director of the bank.

On 1 April 1968, Greenwood was appointed president of the bank, succeeding William Masterton Currie, who had been in office since 1964. Greenwood remained president until 2 September 1971, when he was appointed vice-chairman and transferred to Montreal. He was succeeded as president by vice-chairman Jeffery Page Rein Wadsworth, who had served previously as president from 1963 to 1964. In 1976, Greenwood was appointed president and chairman of three CIBC subsidiaries: the Dominion Realty Company, Imbank Realty Company, and Kinross Mortgage Corporation. Upon his appointment to these roles, he relinquished the title of vice-chairman and returned to the head office in Toronto. The following year, he was appointed executive vice-president for administration.

Greenwood was a member of the Saint James's Club of Montreal, Mount Royal Club, Mount Bruno Country Club, Mount Royal Tennis Club, Toronto Club, Toronto Golf Club, Empire Club of Canada, Granite Club, York Club, and the United Church of Canada. In addition to his role at the bank he served as chairman and president of Swiss Re Management and Swissre Holdings (Canada). He was a director the Imperial Life Assurance Company, the Canadian Council of the International Chamber of Commerce, Toronto Blue Jays Baseball Club, Eaton Life Assurance, North America Reinsurnace Company, Swiss Re, Federal Pioneer, Liberty Mutual of Canada, and the Hospital for Sick Children. He was a member of the Board of Trade of Metropolitan Toronto, National Trust for Scotland, Prospectors and Developers Association, Canadian Institute of Mining and Metallurgy, and Canada Netherlands Council; and member of the board of governors of the Canadian Export Association. Greenwood was a member of the board of trustees of Queen's University, the Canadian Economic Policy Committee, and the C. D. Howe Institute.

== Personal life ==
On 28 June 1947 at St Thomas Anglican Church in Winnipeg, Greenwood married Margaret Purser (1921–1997). The Greenwoods did not have children. Lawrence Greenwood died in Toronto on 21 September 2006 at age 85.
