= L. Stuart Mackersy =

Scottish-Canadian banker (1891–1973)

- Born: 21 April 1891; Edinburgh, Scotland
- Died: 19 July 1973 (aged 82); Toronto, Ontario
- Education: George Watson's College
- Spouse: Gladys Kyle Osborn (m. 1918)
- Military career
- Allegiance: United Kingdom
- Branch: British Army
- Service years: 1914–1919
- Rank: Major
- Unit: Royal Garrison Artillery
- Conflicts: World War I

Lindsay Stuart Mackersy MC (21 April 1891 – 19 July 1973) was a Scottish-Canadian banker who served from 1953 to 1956 as president and from 1956 to 1961 chairman of the Imperial Bank of Canada, and then from 1961 to 1963 as the first chairman of the Canadian Imperial Bank of Commerce (CIBC).

Mackersy began his career with the Imperial Bank in 1911. After serving as an artillery officer in the war, he rejoined the bank and, over the ensuing decades, received a series of managerial positions. He was assigned to the head office in Toronto in 1943, became president in 1953, and chairman in 1956. In October 1960, Mackersy initiated the discussions that resulted in the formation of the CIBC.

After the merger in 1961, he became the new bank's first chairman, remaining in office until 1963. He retired as a director in 1966, and died in 1973 at age 82.

== Early life and military service ==
Mackersy was born in Edinburgh on 21 April 1891 to William Robert Mackersy WS and Mary Luke Callum. Mackersy came to Canada in 1911 and that December joined the Imperial Bank in Toronto and was sent to the bank's branch in Red Deer, Alberta.

In World War I, Mackersy served as an officer in the Royal Garrison Artillery in Malta and France. He was awarded the military cross.

== Career ==
After the war, Mackersy rejoined the bank in Vancouver. In January 1923 he was appointed an accountant in Nelson, British Columbia, and then in April 1927 an accountant in Edmonton. In August 1929 he was appointed assistant manager in Edmonton, in February 1936 assistant western superintendent in Winnipeg, and in January 1942 manager in Winnipeg. In October 1943 he was transferred to the head office in Toronto where he became general supervisor. He was appointed assistant general manager in October 1944, and general manager in January 1950. Mackersy was elected a director in 1951. In 1953, he was appointed president, succeeding Iredell Killaly Johnston, who died unexpectedly in February of that year. Mackersy remained president until 1956, when he was elected chairman of the board.

In October 1960, fearful of a takeover by Barclays Bank Canada, Mackersy opened merger discussion with Neil John McKinnon, president and chairman of the Canadian Bank of Commerce. The first meeting happened secretively at McKinnon's house at 116 Dunvegan Road. The two men arrived quickly at an agreement, and on 1 June 1961, the banks merged to form the Canadian Imperial Bank of Commerce. Upon the merger, McKinnon became president and Mackersy became chairman. Mackersy remained in office until 23 May 1963. He remained a director until his retirement in December 1966.

== Personal life ==
On 14 September 1918 at Christ Church Crewe, Mackersy married Gladys Kyle Osborn (1893–1965) of Nantwich, Cheshire. They had three daughters, Monica (1923–2008), Joan (–2003), and Anne. Mackersy died in Toronto on 19 July 1973 at age 82.
