= Weyburn Security Bank Building =

Historic building in Canada

Coordinates: 49.66151°N 103.85345°W

- Interactive map of the Weyburn Security Bank Building area

General information
- Architectural style: Classical Revival and Chicago School
- Location: 76 - 3rd Street, Weyburn, Saskatchewan, Canada
- Construction started: 1910
- Completed: 1910
- Client: Weyburn Security Bank

Design and construction
- Architects: Long, Lamoreaux & Long; Benjamin O. Boyum (supervising architect)

The Weyburn Security Bank Building (also referred to as the Imperial Bank of Canada Building) is located at 76 - 3rd Street in Weyburn, Saskatchewan, Canada and is a two-storey building with a glazed terracotta façade.

Backed by American interests, Weyburn Security Bank sought Minneapolis-based architectural firm of Long, Lamoureux and Long to designed the building in a Classical Revival and Chicago School that was more representative of banks in the Western US. The building is a designated Provincial Heritage Property. The building was built in 1910 for the Weyburn Security Bank that merged with the Imperial Bank of Canada in 1931. Today the building functions as an active CIBC branch.

Although the building designed in US by Long, Lamoureux & Long, the building was erected under the supervision of Benjamin O. Boyum, who was sent from Minneapolis in 1910. Boyum is credited for a handful of other structures in Weyburn:

- McKinnon & Company department store (117 3rd Street NE)
- former Weyburn Town Hall (160 3rd Street NE)
