= Neil McKinnon =

Neil McKinnon may refer to:

- Neil Ross McKinnon, British barrister
- Neil J. McKinnon, Canadian banker

== See also ==
- Neil MacKinnon, Protestant minister
