= Neil J. McKinnon =

Canadian banker (1911–1975)

- Born: 17 January 1911; Cobalt, Ontario
- Died: 4 August 1975 (aged 64); Lake Rosseau, Ontario
- Spouse: Phyllis Adelaide Cowie (m. 1941)

Neil John McKinnon (17 January 1911 – 4 August 1975) was a Canadian banker who served as president and chairman of the Canadian Bank of Commerce, and president and chairman of the Canadian Imperial Bank of Commerce. McKinnon joined the Bank of Commerce in 1925 in Cobalt, Ontario at age 14. In 1945 he was posted to the bank's head office in Toronto as assistant general manager. In 1952 he was appointed general manager, and in 1954 was appointed a vice-president and elected a director. In 1956 he was appointed president, and in 1959 was elected chairman of the board. When the Bank of Commerce merged with the Imperial Bank of Canada on 1 June 1961, McKinnon became president of the new bank, and in 1963 he ceded the presidency to become chairman of the board. McKinnon retired as chairman in December 1973. He died on 4 August 1975 at age 64.

== Biography ==
Neil John McKinnon was born on 17 January 1911 in Cobalt, Ontario to Malcolm McKinnon and Selina Francis McCauley. He joined the Canadian Bank of Commerce in 1925 at age 14. In 1945 he was posted to the bank's head office in Toronto, where he became assistant general manager, and in 1952 he became general manager. Aged 41, McKinnon was the bank's youngest general manager since Sir Byron Edmund Walker assumed the position in 1886 at age 38. In December 1956, McKinnon succeeded James Stewart as the bank's president, and in 1959 succeeded Stewart as chairman.

When the Canadian Bank of Commerce merged with the Imperial Bank of Canada on 1 June 1961, McKinnon became president and chief executive officer of the new bank, while Imperial's chairman Lindsay Stuart Mackersy became chairman of the board. On 23 May 1963, McKinnon succeeded Mackersey as chairman, while Page Wadsworth succeeded McKinnon as president. At the end of 1965 he relinquished the title of chief executive officer. McKinnon retired as chairman in December 1973.

McKinnon was a member of the Toronto Club, York Club, Rosedale Golf Club, Mount Royal Club, Rideau Club, and Links Club. He served also as a director of Canada Life, Brascan, Allied Chemical Canada, TransCanada Pipelines, Ford Motor Company of Canada, Campbell's, Honeywell, Conoco, Falconbridge, and MacMillan Bloedel. McKinnon was a member of the Presbyterian Church in Canada.

On 3 May 1941 at Grace Church on-the-Hill, McKinnon married Phyllis Adelaide Cowie (1918–1998). They had two children, Ian Neil (1946–2021) and Sheila. Neil died on 4 August 1975 of a heart attack while swimming at his cottage on Lake Rosseau. The funeral was held on 8 August at Grace Church on-the-Hill. He was interred in Mount Pleasant Cemetery.
