= Canadian Imperial Bank of Commerce =

Canadian banking institution

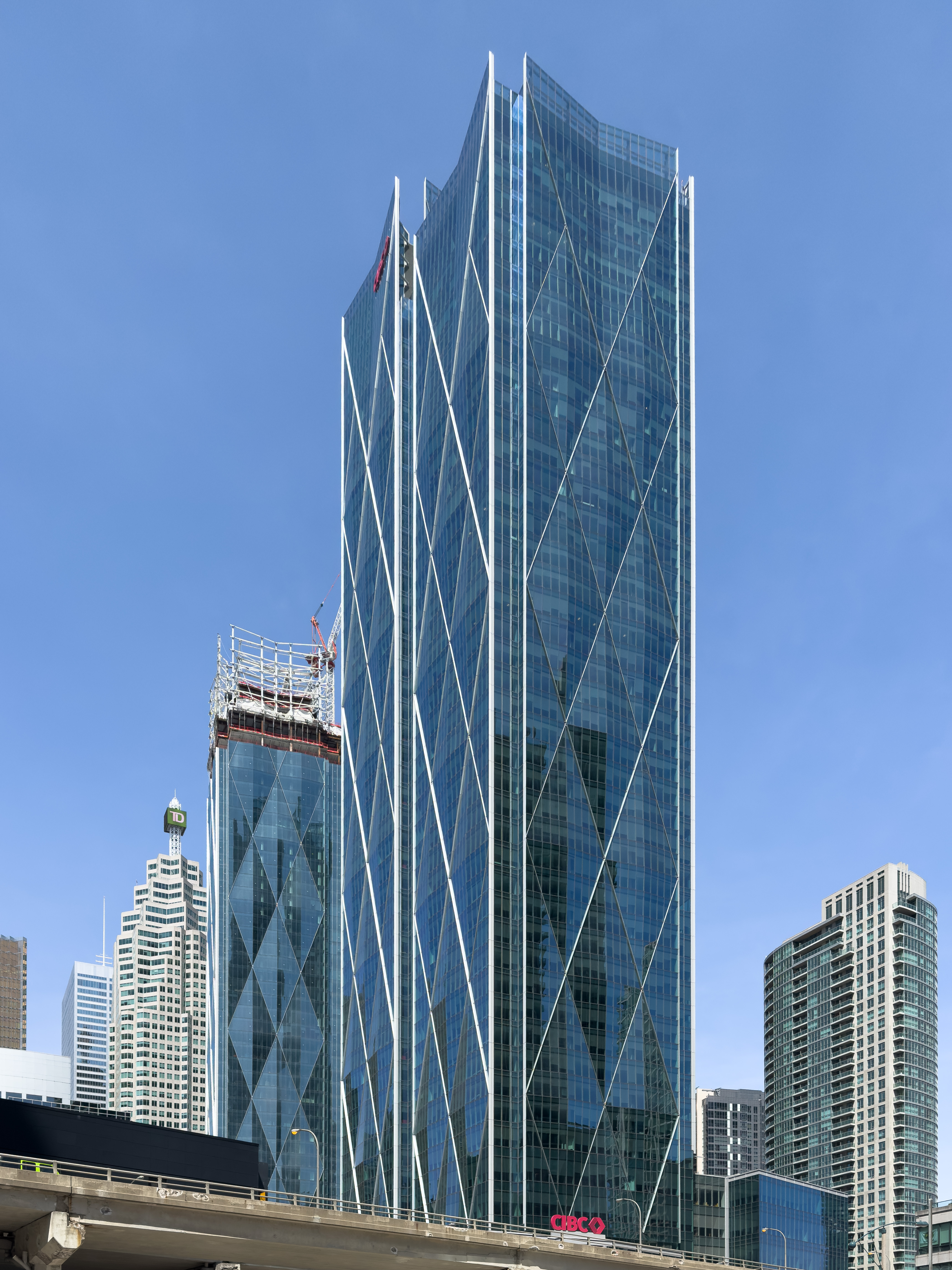
- Headquarters at CIBC Square
- Type: Public
- Traded as: TSX: CM; NYSE: CM; S&P/TSX 60 component
- Industry: Financial services
- Predecessors: Canadian Bank of Commerce; Imperial Bank of Canada
- Founded: June 1, 1961; 65 years ago (Note: The Canadian Imperial Bank of Commerce was established on June 1, 1961, through the merger of the Canadian Bank of Commerce and the Imperial Bank of Canada; the former was established in 1867 and the latter in 1873.)
- Headquarters: Toronto, Ontario, Canada
- Key people: Harry Culham (president and CEO); Katharine Stevenson (chair of the board)
- Products: Asset management; Banking; Commodities; Credit cards; Equities trading; Insurance; Investment management; Mortgage loans; Mutual funds; Exchange-traded funds; Index funds; Private equity; Risk management; Wealth management
- Brands: CIBC Bank USA; Simplii Financial
- Revenue: ▲CA$29.13 billion (2025)
- Net income: ▲CA$8.45 billion (2025)
- AUM: ▲CA$430.98 billion (2025)
- Total assets: ▲CA$1.117 trillion (2025)
- Total equity: ▲CA$64.41 billion (2025)
- Number of employees: 49,824 (2025)
- Subsidiaries: CIBC Bank USA; CIBC Investments (Cayman) Limited; CIBC Cayman Holdings Limited; CIBC Trust Corporation; CIBC World Markets plc; CIBC Asset Management Inc.
- Website: cibc.com

The Canadian Imperial Bank of Commerce (CIBC; French: Banque canadienne impériale de commerce) is a Canadian multinational banking and financial services corporation headquartered at CIBC Square in Toronto's Financial District. The Canadian Imperial Bank of Commerce was formed through the 1961 merger of the Canadian Bank of Commerce (founded in 1867) and the Imperial Bank of Canada (founded in 1873), in the largest merger between chartered banks in Canadian history. It is one of two "Big Five" banks founded in Toronto, the other being the Toronto-Dominion Bank.

The bank has four strategic business units: Canadian Personal and Business Banking, Canadian Commercial Banking and Wealth Management, U.S. Commercial Banking and Wealth Management, and Capital Markets. It has international operations in the United States, the Caribbean, Asia, and United Kingdom. CIBC serves 15 million clients globally, and has 50,000 employees. The company was ranked at number 172 on the 2013 Forbes Global 2000 listing.

CIBC's institution number is 010, and the SWIFT code is CIBCCATT.

== Predecessor banks ==
=== Imperial Bank of Canada ===
The Imperial Bank of Canada was founded in Toronto in 1873 by Henry Stark Howland. The bank set up its offices in the Exchange Building on Wellington Street, where it remained until 1936. That year, it moved to a new building at the corner of King and Bay, where CIBC would build Commerce Court West in 1973. Imperial acquired several banks, including the Niagara District Bank (1875), and Weyburn Security Bank (1931), and the Canadian operations of Barclays (1956). After the end of World War II, Imperial was the country's fifth-largest bank, with assets under administration of approximately $270 billion.

=== Canadian Bank of Commerce ===
William McMaster founded the Canadian Bank of Commerce which opened on May 15, 1867, in Toronto as competition for the Bank of Montreal; by 1874 it had 24 branches. The Imperial Bank of Canada opened in Toronto on March 18, 1875, founded by former Commerce Vice-president Henry Stark Howland. By the end of 1895, the Canadian Bank of Commerce had grown to 58 branches and the Imperial Bank of Canada to 18. The 1896 gold strike in the Yukon prompted the Dominion Government to ask the Canadian Bank of Commerce to open a branch in Dawson City.

Wood, Gundy & Company, the precursor of CIBC's investment banking arm, opened its doors on February 1, 1905. During World War I, it took a prominent and active role in the organization of Victory Loans.

Acquisitions in the 1920s caused the Commerce Bank to become one of the strongest branch networks in Canada with over 700 local branches; and the bank opened international branches in Cuba, Jamaica, Barbados and Trinidad during the same period.

The Canadian Bank of Commerce opened its new head office in Toronto in 1931. An observation gallery on the 32nd floor attracted visitors who could get an aerial view of the city. At a height of 145 metres (476 ft), it was the tallest building in the Commonwealth of Nations until 1962 with the completion of CIBC Tower in Montreal.

In 1936, the Commerce was the first Canadian bank to establish a personal loans department. Following World War II, both banks opened new branches. Although the banks had been barred from the mortgage business in 1871, the Canadian government now called upon them to provide mortgage services. So, in 1954, Canadian banks started offering mortgages for new construction.

== History of the bank ==
=== Merger of Imperial and Commerce ===
The origins of the Imperial–Commerce merger lay in the actions of Barclays Bank. Barclays began operating in Canada in 1929, but in 1956 sold its Canadian operations to the Imperial Bank. Barclays took payment partly in the form of Imperial stock. In 1960, without informing Imperial's board, Barclays began buying additional Imperial stock on the open market. L. Stuart Mackersy, chairman of Imperial, believed Barclays was making a play to take over Imperial. Mackersy thought that a takeover of a small bank such as Imperial was inevitable, but preferred to work with domestic rather than British concerns. In October 1960, Mackersy approached Neil J. McKinnon, the president and chairman of the Commerce, with a proposal to merge the two banks. Their first meeting took place secretively at McKinnon's house at 116 Dunvegan Road in Forest Hill, making the house the birthplace of the CIBC. According to Mackersy, within ten minutes he and McKinnon reached an agreement to merge their banks.

=== Operations of CIBC ===
On 1 June 1961, the Canadian Bank of Commerce and the Imperial Bank of Canada merged to form the Canadian Imperial Bank of Commerce with over 1,200 branches across Canada. The new bank possessed the greatest resources and the most branches of any bank in the country.

In 1964, the bank operated a floating branch using the passenger vessel MV Jean Brilliant along the north shore of the St. Lawrence River in Quebec, billed as the only floating branch in Canada for 5000 customers. In 1967, both Canada and CIBC celebrated their centenaries and CIBC was the only chartered bank to have a branch on-site at Expo 67. Also at this time computerization began to change banking services and the Yonge and Bloor branch in Toronto was the first Canadian bank branch to update customer bank books via computer. This also marked the introduction of inter-branch banking. Before the decade was out, CIBC had introduced the first 24-hour cash dispenser, which would eventually become the ATM.

Following the merger, the new bank commissioned a new head office. While planning to retain Commerce Court North, the bank hired architect I. M. Pei to design a three-building complex. The result was Commerce Court consisting of a landscaped courtyard complementing the existing building and included the newly built 786 ft (240 m) Commerce Court West. When completed in 1973, the 57-storey building was the tallest in Canada, and the largest stainless-steel-clad building in the world.

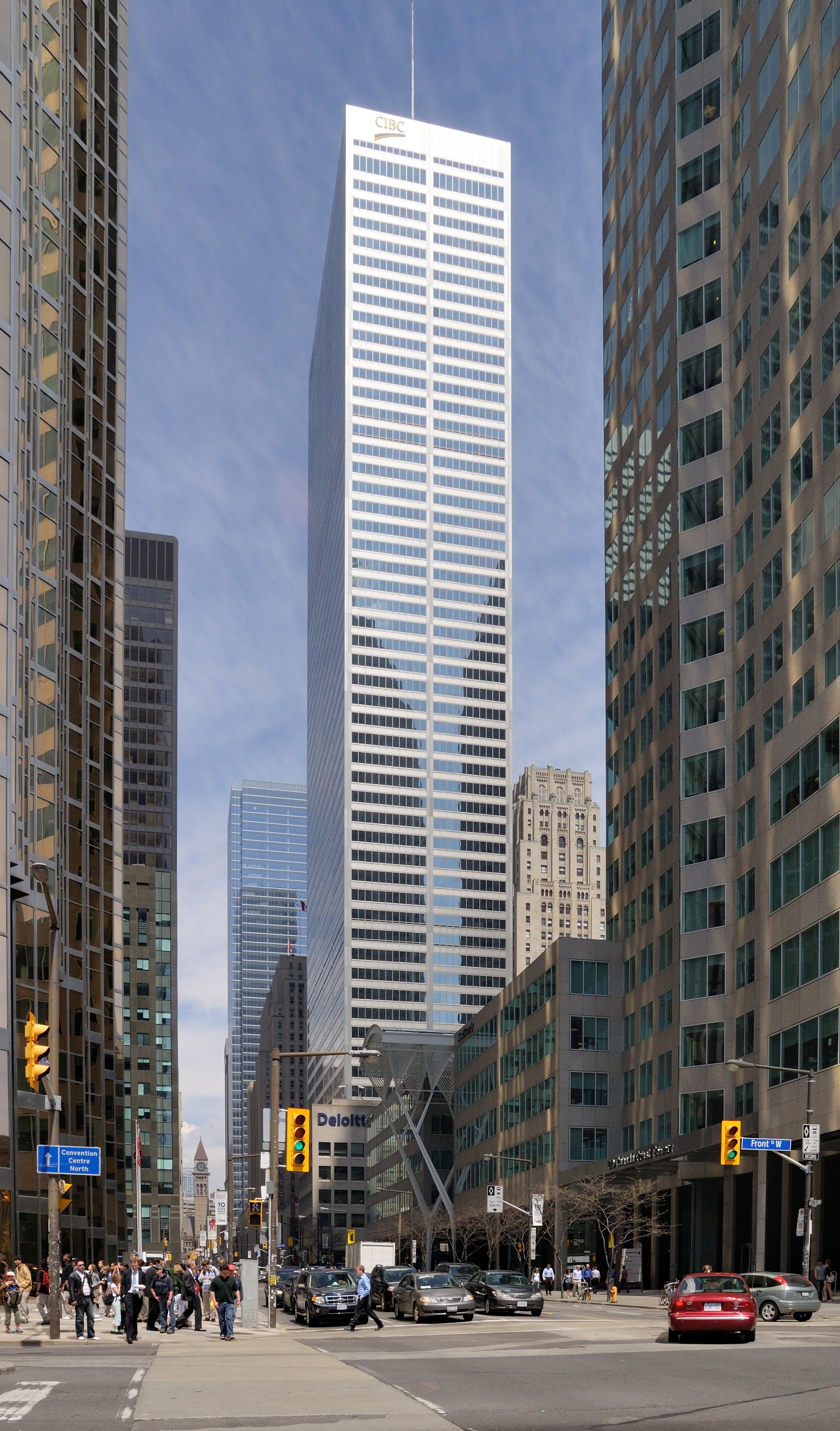
Commerce Court West from Front and Bay Street. The building was used as CIBC's head office from 1973 to 2021.

Changes to federal and provincial regulations ending the separation of banks, investment dealers, trust companies and insurance companies came in 1987. CIBC quickly took advantage of this and became the first Canadian bank to operate an investment dealer, CIBC Securities, offering services to the public.

In 1988, CIBC acquired a majority interest in Wood Gundy which brought a well-respected name and reputation in underwriting. Shortly thereafter, the corporation merged Wood Gundy and CIBC Securities under the name CIBC Wood Gundy which became CIBC Oppenheimer in 1997 and later, CIBC World Markets.

In 1992, CIBC introduced automated telephone banking; in 1995 the bank launched its website, and shortly thereafter began offering banking services online. In 1996, CIBC formed HP Intria Items, alongside Hewlett-Packard and Fiserv Canada. In 2005, CIBC acquired the shares of the company from Fiserv Canada, resulting in Intria Items becoming a unit of CIBC. In 1998, CIBC joined with Loblaws to create President's Choice Financial which it launched in 28 Ottawa area stores.

CIBC agreed to merge with the Toronto-Dominion Bank in 1998. However the Government of Canada, at the recommendation of the minister of finance, Paul Martin, blocked the merger – as well as another proposed by the Bank of Montreal with the Royal Bank of Canada – as not in the best interest of Canadians.

==== 21st century ====
Logo of CIBC, 2003-2021

In 2000, CIBC signed an agreement with the New York-based Aplettix Inc., a firm specializing in secure transaction systems in the banking sector; although the partnership was later abandoned for alternatives such as VeriSign.

The early 2000s saw the bank divest from its real estate and investments outside of its business strategy. In 2000, CIBC sold its 10 per cent stake to Rogers Media. CIBC was a minority shareholder in Major League Baseball's Toronto Blue Jays, with partner Labatt's Breweries from their inception in 1977. The CIBC Leadership Centre in King City, was sold to Benchmark Hospitality in 2001. In 2002, CIBC disbanded Amicus FSB, and sold its assets to E*Trade Bank. Amicus FSB was formed in 1999 in the United States with Winn Dixie and Safeway Inc. under the Marketplace Bank and Safeway Select Bank brands. In the same year, CIBC signed a 10-year agreement with TSYS of Columbus, Georgia to outsource credit card processing operations.

In 2004, the bank sold Juniper Financial Corporation to Barclays Bank. Juniper Financial was previously acquired by CIBC in 2001. The bank sold EDULINX Canada Corporation to Nelnet Canada Inc., the Canadian unit of Nelnet, Inc., in late 2004. Li Ka Shing was the largest foreign shareholder in the bank for over two decades, but in early 2005 he sold his portion (est. CA$1.2 billion) to establish a Canadian charity, the Li Ka Shing Foundation. CIBC was Li's choice for financing many of his Canadian ventures, like Husky Energy. Li had reportedly backed personal and commercial banking head Holger Kluge to succeed Al Flood as CEO of CIBC in 1999.

CIBC sold its corporate and purchasing credit card business to U.S. Bank Canada in October 2006 which joined it with business charge cards it previously acquired from Royal Bank of Canada. In the same year, CIBC's stock ticker symbol on the New York Stock Exchange changed from BCM to CM to bring it in line with the ticker symbol on the Toronto Stock Exchange.

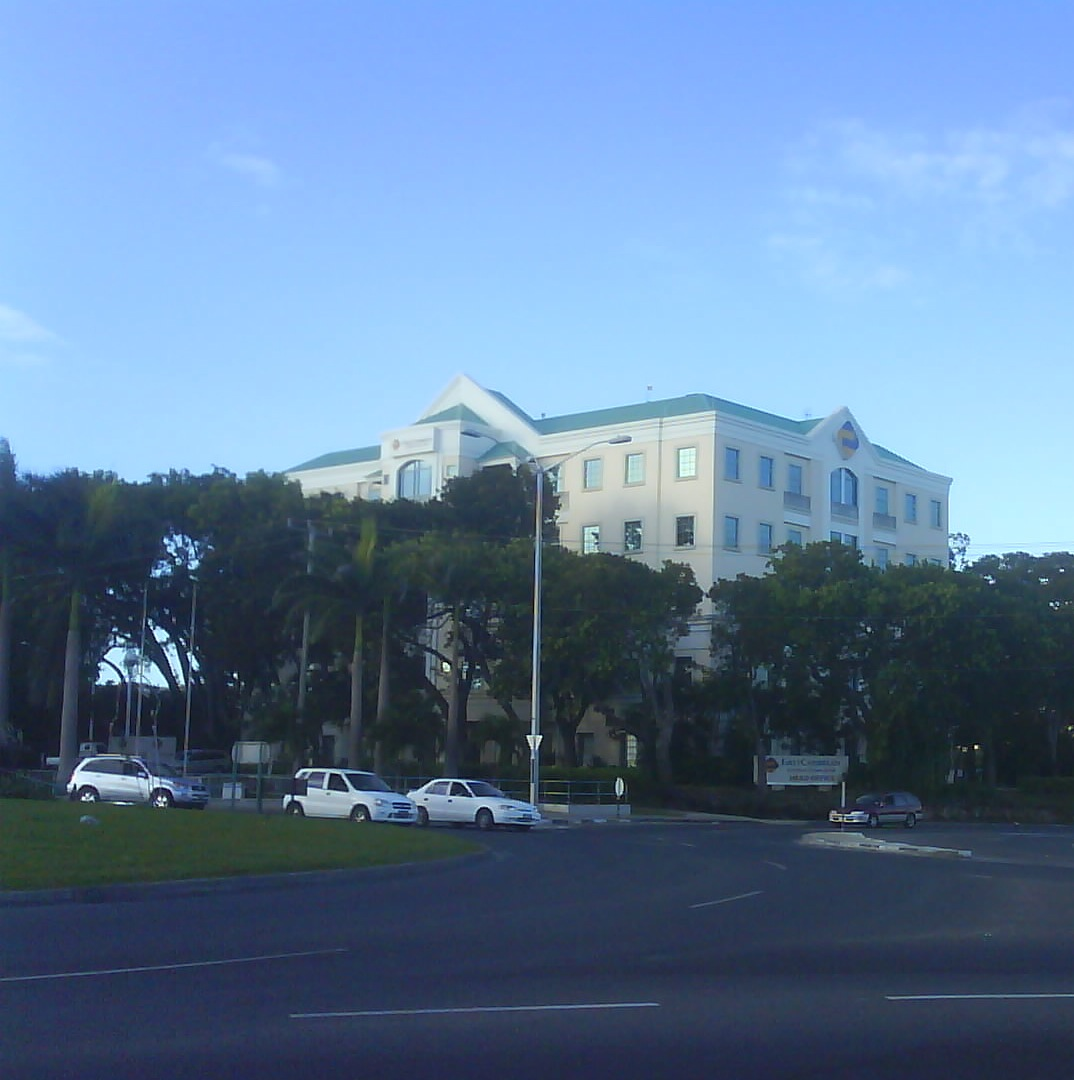
Head office for FirstCaribbean International Bank in 2010, a year before the bank was re-branded under CIBC.

In December 2006, CIBC acquired majority control of its publicly held joint venture FirstCaribbean International Bank for just over US$1 billion, (Bds$2 billion), when it purchased the 43.7% stake owned by Barclays Bank. CIBC rebranded the division CIBC FirstCaribbean International Bank in 2011.

On February 12, 2009, the Trinidad and Tobago Express reported that CIBC was pursuing discussions to buy CL Financial's stake in the Republic Bank of Trinidad and Tobago. As part of a "bail out" agreement of CL Financial by the government of Trinidad and Tobago during the 2008 financial crisis, the corporation was required to sell Republic and other assets. As of February 2011, CL Financial had yet to agree to a sale.

In February, 2010 CIBC became the first chartered bank in Canada to launch a mobile banking iPhone App. It surpassed 100,000 downloads in just over one month following launch, with over 1 million client logins to CIBC Mobile Banking since its introduction. Four months later, the bank announced it signed a deal to buy a CA$2.1-billion credit card portfolio from Citigroup's Citibank Canada MasterCard business. Finally in October of that year, CIBC announced that it would be the first bank in Canada to introduce the internationally used Visa-branded debit card.

In April 2013, CIBC reached an agreement with Invesco to acquire Atlantic Trust, the company's wealth management unit for US$210 million.

CIBC announced in June 2016 that it would acquire the Chicago-based commercial bank PrivateBancorp for US$3.8 billion. The sale completed in June 2017 and in August PrivateBank announced it would rebrand itself as CIBC Bank USA.

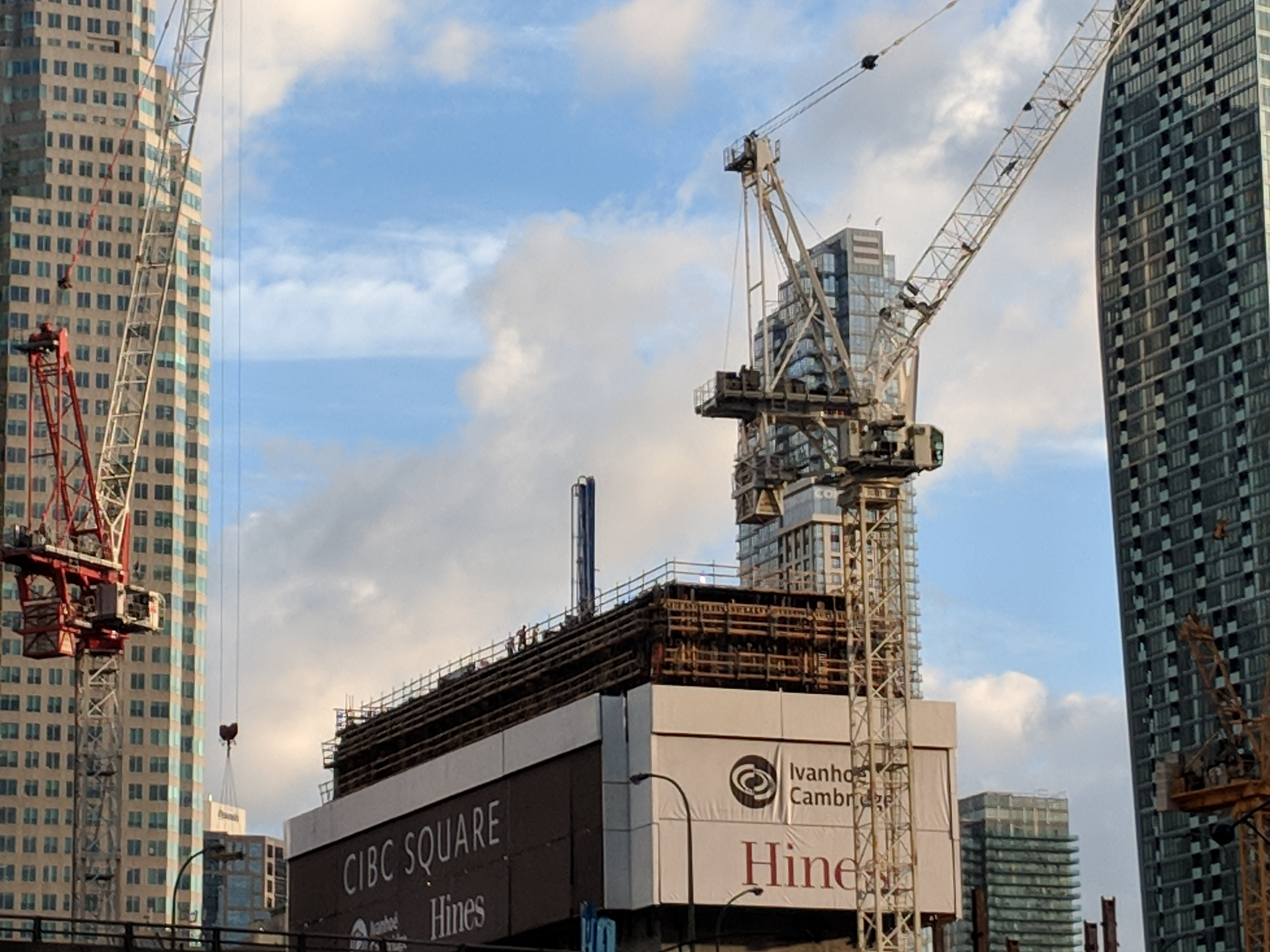
Construction for CIBC's new headquarters, CIBC Square in Toronto, September 2018.

In April 2017, CIBC, announced it would move its headquarters to the Bay Park Centre under development by Hines Interests Limited Partnership and Ivanhoé Cambridge. Under the terms of its lease, the complex became CIBC Square. On November 1, 2021, CIBC Square became the bank's principal headquarters.

In November 2018, CBC reported that CIBC was among the top brands used in phishing attacks, with the bank seeing a surge in fake mail attempts that prior quarter by 600%. In March 2025, CIBC became the first major Canadian bank to sign the Canadian government's voluntary code of conduct for generative artificial intelligence. The year prior, CIBC had introduced a number of generative AI pilot programs.

In 2025, CIBC signaled a strategic shift under incoming CEO Harry Culham, with plans to expand its presence in high-margin areas such as wealth management and U.S. commercial banking.

In Q3 2025, CIBC reported adjusted net income of C$2.1 billion.

=== Acquisitions ===
- Canadian Imperial Bank of Commerce (amalgamation 1961)
  - Canadian Bank of Commerce (formed 1867)
    - Bank of Canada (1858, charter dormant, acquired in 1867)
    - Gore Bank (1870)
    - Bank of British Columbia (1901)
    - Halifax Banking Company (1903)
    - Merchants Bank of Prince Edward Island (1906)
    - Eastern Townships Bank (1912)
    - Bank of Hamilton (1924)
    - Standard Bank of Canada (1928)
  - Imperial Bank of Canada (formed 1875)
    - Niagara District Bank (1875)
    - Weyburn Security Bank (1931)
    - Barclays Bank (Canada) (1956)
  - Wood Gundy (1988)
  - President's Choice Financial (1998; Simplii Financial from 2017)
  - FirstCaribbean International Bank (2006)
  - Atlantic Trust (2013)
  - Privatebancorp (2016, later renamed CIBC Bank USA)

== Corporate activities and operations ==
=== North America ===
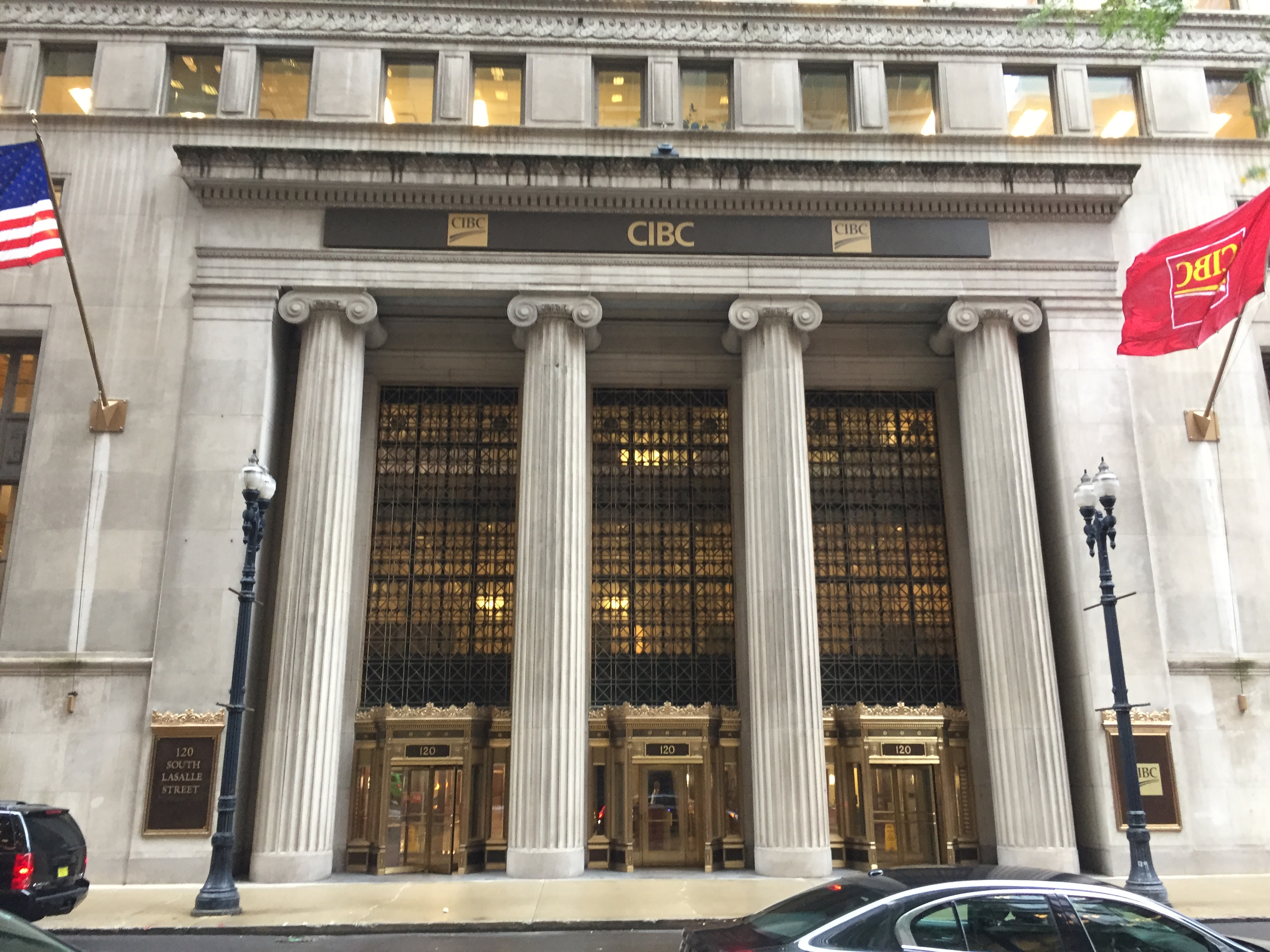
120 South LaSalle in Chicago serves as the headquarters for CIBC Bank USA.

- CIBC Mellon Global Securities Services: formed by CIBC and Mellon Bank Corp. (now Bank of New York Mellon) of Pittsburgh PA 1996 and Canada Trust's (now TD Canada Trust) pension and custody business in 1997
- Canadian Eastern Finance Limited (CEF): formed by CIBC and Hutchison Whampoa of Hong Kong; includes CEF Capital Limited, CEF Investment Management Limited
- Soltrus Inc 2001: provider of digital trust services for businesses and consumers to communicate and transact over digital networks owned by CIBC, Telus Corp and VeriSign Inc.
- CIBC Bank USA 2017: Formerly the Chicago-based bank Privatebancorp (incorporated 1989 in Delaware) with operations in 13 states mainly in the East Coast. Business focus is in middle market commercial banking, personal and small business banking, as well as private banking and investment management services. Rebranded to CIBC Bank USA in September 2017.
- Simplii Financial: a direct banking subsidiary established in 2017 after CIBC and Loblaw mutually ended their joint venture to provide consumer banking products under the President's Choice Financial brand. All PC Financial bank accounts, loans, and investment products were transferred to Simplii beginning November 1, 2017.

==== Caribbean ====
In 1920, Canadian Bank of Commerce established its first branches in the West Indies in Bridgetown, Barbados, and in Kingston, Jamaica. The same year it also opened branches in Port of Spain, Trinidad, and Havana, Cuba. Its first branch in Mexico City opened in 1910. In 1957, the bank opened a branch in Nassau, Bahamas, and in the subsequent years expanded its operations in Jamaica.

Between 1963 and 1988, the bank expanded its branch network in Barbados opened branches in St. Vincent, Antigua, and St Lucia. In 1988, CIBC sold 45% of its shares in CIBC Jamaica via a public share issue. Between 1993 and 1996, the bank restructured its holdings in the Caribbean, with the incorporation of CIBC West Indies Holdings Limited and CIBC Caribbean Limited. CIBC West Indies Holdings then sold 30% of its shares to the public. In 1997, CIBC issued 5 million shares in CIBC Bahamas Limited to the public.

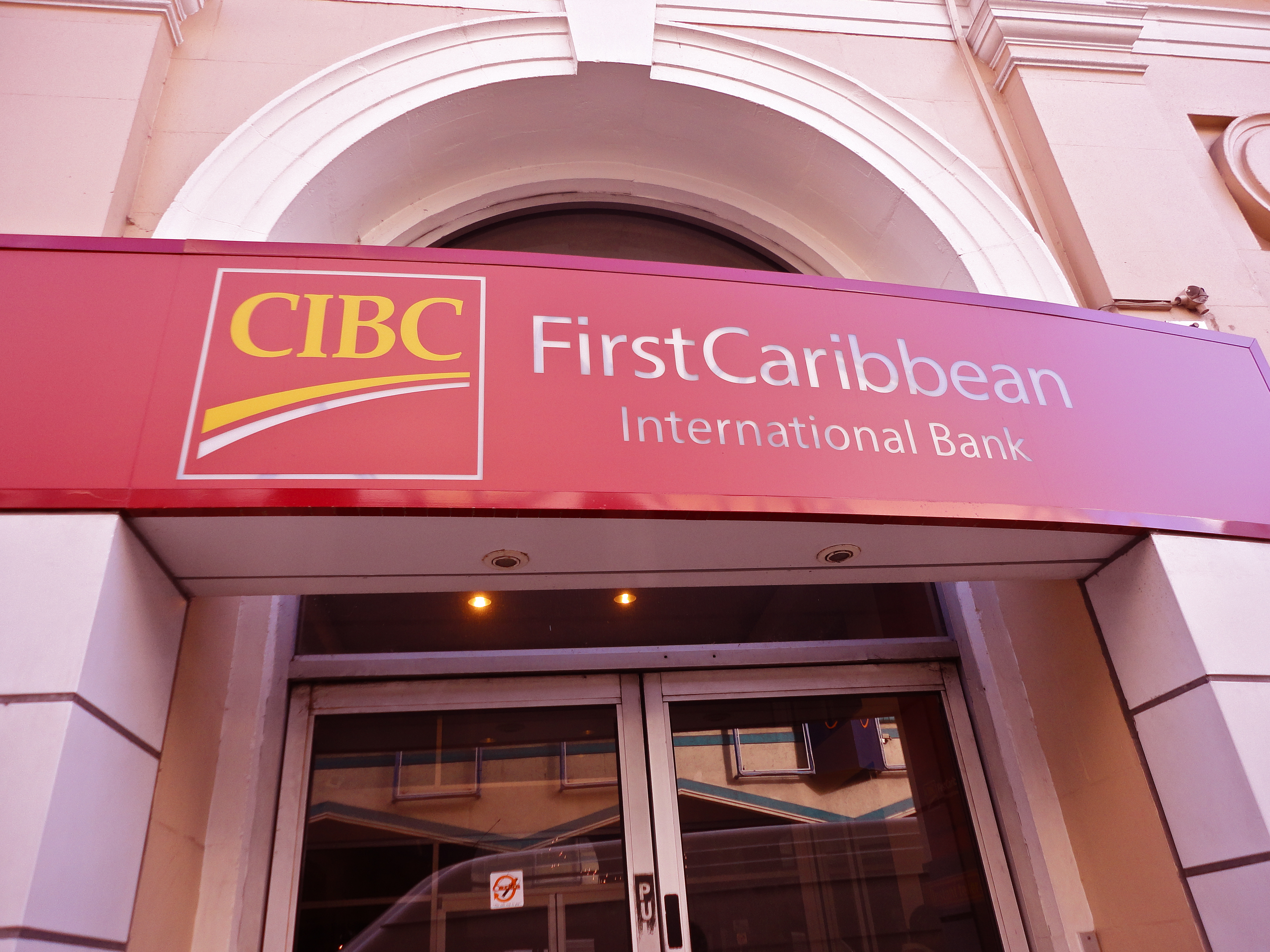
CIBC FirstCaribbean International Bank branch in Bridgetown, Barbados.

On October 31, 2001, Barclays and CIBC agreed to combine their Caribbean operations to establish FirstCaribbean International Bank. CIBC bought Barclays' stake in 2006 to give it control of approximately 92% of FirstCaribbean, which was rebranded as CIBC FirstCaribbean International Bank. In 2010, CIBC acquired a 22.5% equity of Butterfield Bank of Bermuda.

=== Governance ===
CIBC is well known for its publicized battles of succession to the top position of president and CEO (formerly styled chairman and CEO until 2003 when the positions were separated). When Al Flood became CEO, one of his first acts was to fire his chief rival Paul Cantor. In 1999, the company saw a competition between Wood Gundy (now CIBC World Markets) chief John S. Hunkin and Personal/Commercial banking head Holger Kluge, with Kluge retiring after Hunkin became chairman. In February 2004, Hunkin forced his friend and heir-apparent, David Kassie, to resign as chairman and CEO of World Markets after several scandals in the US. Both men had waived their bonuses in 2002 after that year produced the worst results in the history of the bank. Kassie afterwards founded Genuity Capital and was alleged to have raided 20 key employees from World Markets for his new startup, causing CIBC to file suit. Gerald T. McCaughey became Kassie's replacement heading World Markets and in February 2004, was promoted to president and chief operating officer, assuring his succession as CEO. Shortly after assuming his position, McCaughey reportedly dismissed Jill Denham, vice chair of retail markets and a potential rival for the CEO post. Denham was reportedly a close ally of Hunkin and Kassie, and McCaughey wanted to build his own senior executive team.

Current executive team:

- Harry Culham – President and chief executive officer
- Kevin Li – Senior Executive Vice-President and Group Head, U.S. Region; President and CEO, CIBC Bank USA
- Frank Guse – Senior Executive Vice-President and Chief Risk Officer, CIBC
- Christian Exshaw – Senior Executive Vice President and Group Head, Capital Markets
- Jon Hountalas – Senior Executive Vice-President and Group Head, Canadian Banking
- Christina Kramer – Senior Executive Vice-President and Group Head, Technology, Infrastructure and Innovation
- Kikelomo Lawal – Executive Vice President and Chief Legal Officer
- Hratch Panossian – Senior Executive Vice President and Chief Financial Officer
- Sandy Sharman – Senior Executive Vice-President and Group Head, People, Culture and Brand

Current members of the board of directors:

- Katharine B. Stevenson (2011) – Chair of the board
- Ammar Aljoundi (2022) - President and Chief Executive Officer Agnico Eagle Mines Limited
- Charles J. G. Brindamour (2020) – Chief Executive Officer, Intact Financial Corporation
- Nanci E. Caldwell (2015) – corporate director
- Michelle L. Collins (2017) – president, Cambium LLC
- Luc Desjardins (2009) – president and chief executive officer, Superior Plus Corp.
- Victor G. Dodig (2014) – president and chief executive officer, CIBC
- Kevin J. Kelly (2013) – corporate director
- Christine E. Larsen (2016) – Corporate Director
- Bill Morneau (2022) - Corporate Director
- Mary Lou Maher (2021) – corporate director
- Martine Turcotte (2014) – corporate director
- Barry Zubrow (2015) – president, ITB LLC

== Sponsorships ==
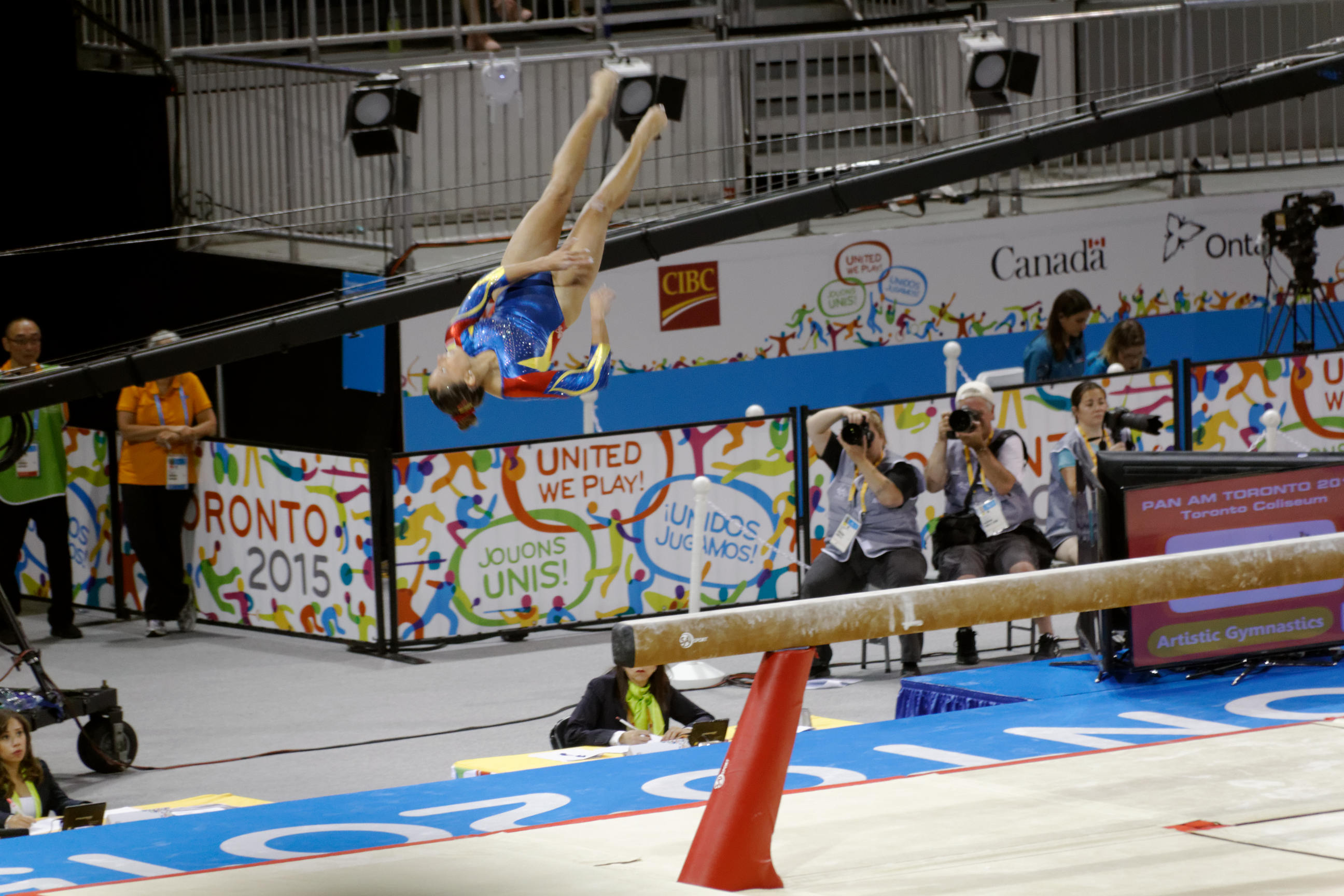
A billboard featuring CIBC's logo at a gymnastics event at the 2015 Pan American Games.

As a founding partner of the Toronto Blue Jays baseball club, CIBC was the team's official bank until selling its ownership stake in 2000. Other sporting events sponsored by CIBC include the 2015 Pan American Games and 2015 Parapan American Games, in which it served as the lead partner. The partnership was announced on 27 October 2011, when CIBC formalized its partnership with the PANAM Toronto 2015 Organizing Committee.

CIBC has also partnered with a number of other Canadian corporations, such as Petro-Canada. As part of its purchase of MasterCard from Citibank Canada in 2010, CIBC acquired the co-branded Petro-Canada rewards credit card and continues to jointly market the card. From 1991 to 2014, CIBC was the primary issuer of credit cards as part of Air Canada's loyalty program, Aeroplan. In 2009, the airline loyalty program announced that a new agreement with Toronto-Dominion Bank would be effective 1 January 2014, ending the relationship with CIBC. In 2013, an agreement was reached to allow CIBC to retain half of customers who had Aeroplan credit cards, and continue issuing Aeroplan credit cards as a secondary issuer to TD. In October 2019, CIBC partnered with Parkland Corporation on its Journie Rewards program for Chevron, Pioneer, Ultramar, and FasGas Plus.

CIBC is an industry partner of the University of Waterloo Stratford Campus.

As the successor of Privatebank, CIBC USA is a sponsor of Chicago Fire FC.

CIBC has supported Thompson Rivers University (TRU) for multiple years. CIBC has supported TRU students by providing financial awards, co-operative education programs, employment, and training positions. CIBC staff have also volunteered time to mentor TRU students. In return, TRU recognized CIBC as a distinguished alumni in 2014, awarding them with the Milestone Achievement Award for their contribution to TRU students and alumni.

CIBC is also a sponsor of the Northern Super League, Canada's top women's soccer league.

== Controversies ==
=== Employee defalcation ===
A former employee embezzled several million dollars of CIBC funds during the 1970s and 1980s as part of a gambling related conspiracy.

=== Unpaid employee overtime ===
In June 2007, Dara Fresco, a Toronto teller, along with current and former non-management, non-unionized employees, who are or were tellers and other front-line customer service employees, working within Canadian Imperial Bank of Commerce's (CIBC) various retail branch offices across Canada; brought on a $600 million class-action lawsuit against their employer, CIBC, in regards to lack of overtime pay. Fresco v Canadian Imperial Bank of Commerce alleges that class members are assigned heavier workloads than could be completed within their standard working hours. They were required or permitted to work overtime to meet the demands of their jobs and CIBC failed to pay for the overtime work in direct contravention of the Canada Labour Code under which they are regulated.

The Ontario Superior Court dismissed the suit June 18, 2012, stating the evidence "provides no basis that there was, in fact, a systemic practice of unpaid overtime at CIBC." An employee of the Bank of Nova Scotia (Scotiabank) filed a similar suit which the Superior Court certified. Fresco and Scotiabank each appealed their adverse, and contradictory, rulings and the Ontario Court of Appeal ruled that both cases could proceed. Both banks appealed to the Supreme Court of Canada which on March 21, 2013, denied their requests and allowed the lawsuits to proceed.

In March 2020, the Ontario Superior Court of Justice granted summary judgment against CIBC, finding that its overtime and hours-of-work recording practices breached its overtime obligations to about 31,000 current and former employees. The court found that CIBC's practice of not recording actual overtime hours and requiring managerial pre-approval for overtime pay was too restrictive and violated Labour Code provisions requiring overtime pay if employers "require or permit" it. In February 2022, the Court of Appeal for Ontario denied an appeal by CIBC and upheld the Superior Court's decision. In January 2023, CIBC chose to pay CA$153 million to settle the suit.

=== Enron ===
On December 22, 2003, the U.S. Securities and Exchange Commission (SEC) fined CIBC US$80 million for its role in the manipulation of Enron financial statements. This consists of $37.5 million to repay ill-gotten gains, a $37.5 million penalty and $5 million in interest. The money is intended to be returned to Enron fraud victims pursuant to the Fair Fund provisions of Section 308(a) of the Sarbanes–Oxley Act of 2002.

The SEC also sued three of CIBC's executives. CIBC Executive Vice President Daniel Ferguson and former CIBC executive director Mark Wolf agreed to settle for US$563,000 and US$60,000, respectively. Ian Schottlaender, former managing director in CIBC's corporate leveraged finance group in New York initially contested the charges but on July 12, 2004, he agreed to pay US$528,750 as well as be barred from serving as an officer or director of a publicly traded company for a period of five years. Under these agreements the individuals neither admit nor deny wrongdoing.

The SEC complaint charges "CIBC and the three executives with having helped Enron to mislead its investors through a series of complex structured finance transactions over a period of several years preceding Enron's bankruptcy." The agreement reached between the SEC and CIBC permanently enjoins CIBC from violating the antifraud, books and records, and internal control provisions of the federal securities laws.

On August 2, 2005, CIBC paid US$2.4 billion to settle a class action lawsuit brought by a group of pension funds and investment managers, including the University of California, which claims that "systematic fraud by Enron and its officers led to the loss of billions and the collapse of the company."

=== Market timing ===
On July 25, 2005, CIBC confirmed it would pay US$125 million to settle an investigation into its role in the 2003 mutual fund scandal. Linda Chatman Thomsen, director of the SEC's division of enforcement, said, "by knowingly financing customers' late trading and market timing, as well as providing financing in amounts far greater than the law allows, CIHI and World Markets boosted their customers' trading profits at the expense of long-term mutual fund shareholders." Under the settlement, CIBC neither admitted nor denied the allegations.

=== Privacy ===
On April 18, 2005, the privacy commissioner of Canada expressed disappointment in the way CIBC dealt with incidents involving the bank misdirecting faxes containing customers' personal information. One involved misdirecting faxes to a scrap yard operator in West Virginia from 2001 to 2004. The misdirected faxes contained the social insurance numbers, home addresses, phone numbers, and detailed bank account data of several hundred bank customers.

The second incident involved a Dorval businessman and allegedly took place from 2000 to 2004. In both cases, the commissioner noted that the bank did not inform the affected clients, whose personal information was compromised, until the incidents became public and an investigation was underway.

Within days of reports by CTV News and The Globe and Mail, CIBC management announced a directive that banned employees from using fax machines to transmit any documents containing confidential customer information.

On January 18, 2007, CIBC Asset Management announced that the personal information of about 470,000 current and former clients of Talvest Mutual Funds, a CIBC subsidiary, had gone missing. The information may have included client names, addresses, signatures, dates of birth, bank account numbers, beneficiary information and/or social insurance numbers. The incident stemmed from the disappearance of a hard drive containing information on "the process used to open and administer" customer accounts as it was traveling between the bank's Montreal and Toronto offices. The privacy commissioner of Canada stated, "Although I appreciate that the bank notified us of this incident and that it is working cooperatively with my Office, I am nevertheless deeply troubled, especially given the magnitude of this breach, which puts at risk the personal information of hundreds of thousands of Canadians." She immediately launched a privacy investigation.

=== Visa cardholders ===
On August 27, 2004, CIBC confirmed that it would settle a class-action lawsuit on behalf of CIBC Visa cardholders. The plaintiffs alleged that the conversion of foreign-currency transactions resulted in an undisclosed or inadequately disclosed mark-up. After approval by an Ontario Superior Court judge, CIBC announced October 15, 2004, that the settlement would result in the bank paying CA$13.85 million to its cardholders, $1 million to the United Way, $1.65 million to the Class Action Fund of the Law Society of Upper Canada, and $3 million in legal fees. The bank also announced that it has not admitted any liability and is settling to avoid further litigation with its cardholders.

=== Voluntary refund of erroneous charges ===
On May 20, 2004, CIBC announced that it would refund CA$24 million to some of its customers as a result of erroneous overdraft and mortgage charges which were discovered in the course of an internal review. "This is being done as part of CIBC's effort to correct its error and to ensure that it distributes to customers all of the money it received in error," the bank said.

In a similar incident, CIBC announced April 27, 2006 that it's refunding an additional CA$27 million to about 200,000 clients who were overcharged for certain overdraft fees and other borrowing transactions, some of which date back to 1993. In cases where clients were undercharged, the bank decided not to seek reimbursement.

=== Discrimination claims ===
On 27 May 2022, CIBC's London, UK office was sued after Zhuofang Wei, a former executive of the firm, accused the managers of sexual and racial discrimination. This is after the former executive was dismissed in March 2020 due to her objection of taking a new role without a pay increase. Wei sued CIBC for 800,000 pounds or $1 million for lost earnings and damages. CIBC successfully defended the case, however the court was heavily critical of the conduct of senior members of CIBC London's management team.

=== FINTRAC Non-Compliance ===
In 2023, CIBC was fined CA$1.3 million by Financial Transactions and Reports Analysis Centre of Canada for "non-compliance with money laundering and terrorist financing measures".

== Leadership ==
=== President ===
1. Neil John McKinnon, 1 June 1961 – 23 May 1963
2. Jeffery Page Rein Wadsworth, 23 May 1963 – 8 December 1964
3. William Masterton Currie, 8 December 1964 – 1 April 1968
4. Lawrence George Greenwood, 1 April 1968 – 2 September 1971
5. Jeffery Page Rein Wadsworth, 2 September 1971 – 11 December 1973
6. Russell Edward Harrison, 11 December 1973 – 14 December 1976
7. Robert Donald Fullerton, 14 December 1976 – March 1986
  separate divisional presidents, 1986–2003
8. John Stewart Hunkin, 7 August 2003 – 2 December 2004
9. Gerald Thomas McCaughey, 2 December 2004 –15 September 2014
10. Victor George Dodig, 15 September 2014 – 31 October 2025
11. Harry Kenneth Culham, 1 November 2025 – present

=== Chairman of the Board ===
1. Lindsay Stuart Mackersy, 1 June 1961 – 23 May 1963
2. Neil John McKinnon, 23 May 1963 – 11 December 1973
3. Jeffery Page Rein Wadsworth, 11 December 1973 – 14 December 1976
4. Russell Edward Harrison, December 1976 – 17 January 1985
5. Robert Donald Fullerton, 17 January 1985 – 7 June 1992
6. Alvin Lloyd Flood, 7 June 1992 – 3 June 1999
7. John Stewart Hunkin, 3 June 1999 – 7 August 2003
8. William Albert Etherington, 7 August 2003 – 26 February 2009
9. Charlies Sirois, 26 February 2009 – 23 April 2015
10. John Paul Manley, 23 April 2015 – 8 April 2021
11. Katharine Berghuis Stevenson, 8 April 2021 – 31 December 2026
12. William Francis Morneau Jr., 1 January 2027 – present

== See also ==
- Big Five (banks)
- List of largest banks
- List of banks and credit unions in Canada
- List of banks in the Americas
- CIBC Wealth Management
