= Henry Stark Howland =

Businessman (1824–1902)

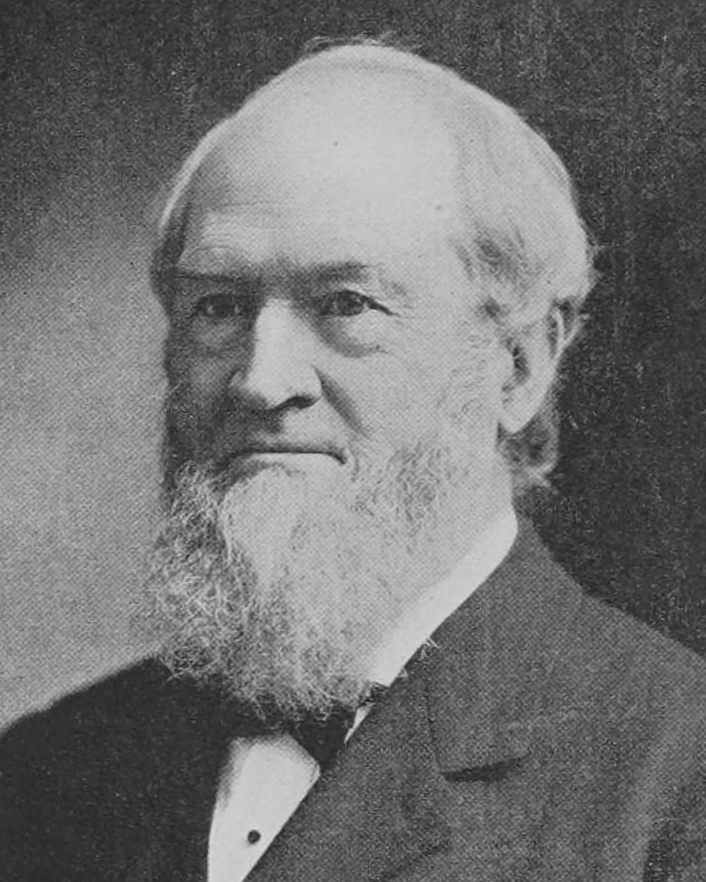
- Born: 2 August 1824; Pawling, New York
- Died: 28 January 1902 (aged 77); Toronto, Ontario
- Spouse: Adelia Sophia Smith (m. 1851)

Henry Stark Howland (2 August 1824 – 28 January 1902) was a businessman and founder of the Imperial Bank of Canada in 1873.

Howland was born in 1824 in Pawling, New York to William Howland and moved to Upper Canada to join his brother William Pearce Howland in 1840 and settled in Lambton Mills, Ontario. Howland acquired a grist mill, sawmill, and general store in Kleinburg, Ontario in 1852 who eventually entered in political life.

Howland spent the 1850s and 1860s in Vaughan, Ontario, becoming postmaster, town councillor and reeve.

In 1864 he moved to Toronto, where he later began a business known as H. S. Howland, Sons and Company. He was one of the founding partners of the Canadian Bank of Commerce in 1867 and left to help found the rival Imperial Bank.

Howland died in 1902 while serving as the Imperial Bank's president.
