= CIBC Bank USA =

American banking division of CIBC

- Formerly: The PrivateBank and Trust Company (1989–2017)
- Type: Subsidiary
- Traded as: (as The PrivateBank) Nasdaq: PVTB (1999–2017)
- Industry: Financial services
- Founded: 1989; 37 years ago
- Headquarters: 120 South LaSalle Street, Chicago, Illinois
- Products: Consumer Banking, Corporate Banking, Insurance, Investment Banking, Mortgage loans, Private Banking, Private Equity, Wealth Management, Credit Cards, Financial Analysis
- AUM: $97 billion (2026)
- Total assets: $84 billion (via CIBC Bancorp USA Inc. holding company) (2026)
- Parent: Canadian Imperial Bank of Commerce (2017–present)
- Website: us.cibc.com

CIBC Bank USA is an American commercial bank headquartered in Chicago, Illinois. Founded in 1989 as The PrivateBank and Trust Company (doing business as The PrivateBank), a subsidiary of PrivateBancorp Inc., the company became a subsidiary of the Toronto-based Canadian Imperial Bank of Commerce (CIBC) after a US$5 billion acquisition in June 2017. This acquisition marks the Canadian bank's second formal entry into the American retail and investment banking market. CIBC Bank is one of the largest banking institutions in the United States.

== History ==
PrivateBancorp was incorporated in Delaware in 1989, and opened its first office in Chicago in 1991. Discussions between PrivateBancorp and CIBC executives regarding an acquisition began in 2013, with CIBC's acquisition completed in June 2017. The subsidiary adopted CIBC branding in September 2017.

CIBC Bank USA is CIBC's second foray into the American commercial banking market. Its previous unsuccessful operations, CIBC National Bank and Amicus Federal Savings Bank, were founded in 2000 to provide co-branded banking services for supermarket chains and both entered voluntary liquidation in 2003. The PrivateBancorp acquisition was the largest in CIBC's history.

== Community partnership ==
CIBC Bank USA holds the naming rights to the CIBC Theatre (formerly The PrivateBank Theatre, The LaSalle Bank Theatre, and The Bank of America Theatre), a performing arts venue in Chicago's Loop. The theater officially adopted the CIBC branding on September 18, 2017.
