= Weyburn Security Bank =

Canadian bank

- Founded: 1910
- Founder: local businessmen
- Defunct: 1931
- Fate: Merged
- Successor: Merged into modern-day Canadian Imperial Bank of Commerce (CIBC)
- Headquarters: Weyburn, Saskatchewan, Canada

The Weyburn Security Bank was a chartered bank headquartered in Weyburn, Saskatchewan, Canada. The bank was established by a group of American investors as a private bank in 1910, by 1911 the bank had advanced to the point where it obtained a Canadian bank charter. Over its 30 years of operation the bank expanded to having assets of $6 million and serving 33 communities. Due to the onset of the great depression, in May 1931 the bank was purchased by the Imperial Bank of Canada. The Weyburn Security Bank Building is a designated provincial heritage building.

== See also ==
- Canadian chartered bank notes
