= Page Wadsworth =

Canadian banker (1911–1995)

- Born: 27 July 1911; Toronto, Ontario
- Died: 21 January 1997 (aged 85); Toronto, Ontario
- Education: Upper Canada College ('28)
- Spouse: Elizabeth Cameron Bunting (m. 1940)

Jeffery Page Rein Wadsworth (27 July 1911 – 21 January 1997) was a Canadian banker who served as president and chairman of the Canadian Imperial Bank of Commerce. Wadsworth joined the Canadian Bank of Commerce in Port Credit in 1928. Over the next three decades he was appointed to several managerial positions, and in 1957 was elected a director and appointed a vice-president. After the bank's merger with the Imperial Bank of Canada in 1961, he became general manager and vice-president of the new bank. In May 1963 he succeeded Neil John McKinnon to become the bank's second president. Wadsworth held the presidency until December 1964, when he became vice-chairman and transferred to Montreal. In September 1971 he was reappointed president, by which time he had become deputy chairman also. The appointment came along with the title of chief executive officer. Wadsworth ceded the presidency in December 1973, when he became chairman and chief executive. He remained chairman of the bank until December 1976.

== Biography ==
Jeffery Page Rein Wadsworth was born in Toronto on 27 July 1911 to William Rein Wadsworth (1871–1929) and Mildred Agnes Jeffery (1874–1941). He had one younger brother, Kenneth Rein Wadsworth (1915–1995). At a young age, the family moved to Port Credit. Page attended Upper Canada College for the 1922–23 school year, then transferred to Lakefield College School, where he studied from 1923 to 1926. In 1926 he returned to Upper Canada College, graduating in 1928.

Wadsworth was a banking executive.

He served as the fifth chancellor of the University of Waterloo, from 1985 to 1991. Wadsworth was granted the status of Chancellor Emeritus on May 27, 1993 at the University of Waterloo's 66th convocation.

Wadsworth was a member of the Toronto Club, York Club, Saint James's Club, Mount Royal Club, Hamilton Club, Ranchmen's Club, and the Anglican Church of Canada. He served as the honorary chairman of the board of governors of Lakefield College School, and as chairman of the board of governors of the University of Waterloo. From 1985 to 1992 he served as Waterloo's chancellor.

On 23 September 1940, Wadsworth married Elizabeth Cameron Bunting (1908–1999) at Grace Church on-the-Hill in Toronto. Elizabeth was the granddaughter of Christopher William Bunting, a newspaper publisher and member of parliament. Page and Elizabeth had one daughter, Elizabeth Paige, who married the Rev. Marvin Gray McDermott (1938–2023). Page Wadsworth died at the Princess Margaret Hospital in Toronto on Tuesday, 21 January 1997. The funeral was held on Friday, 24 January at St. Paul's in Toronto. He was interred St. Philip's Churchyard Cemetery in Weston, Ontario.
