= Eastern Townships Bank =

Canadian bank (1855–1912)

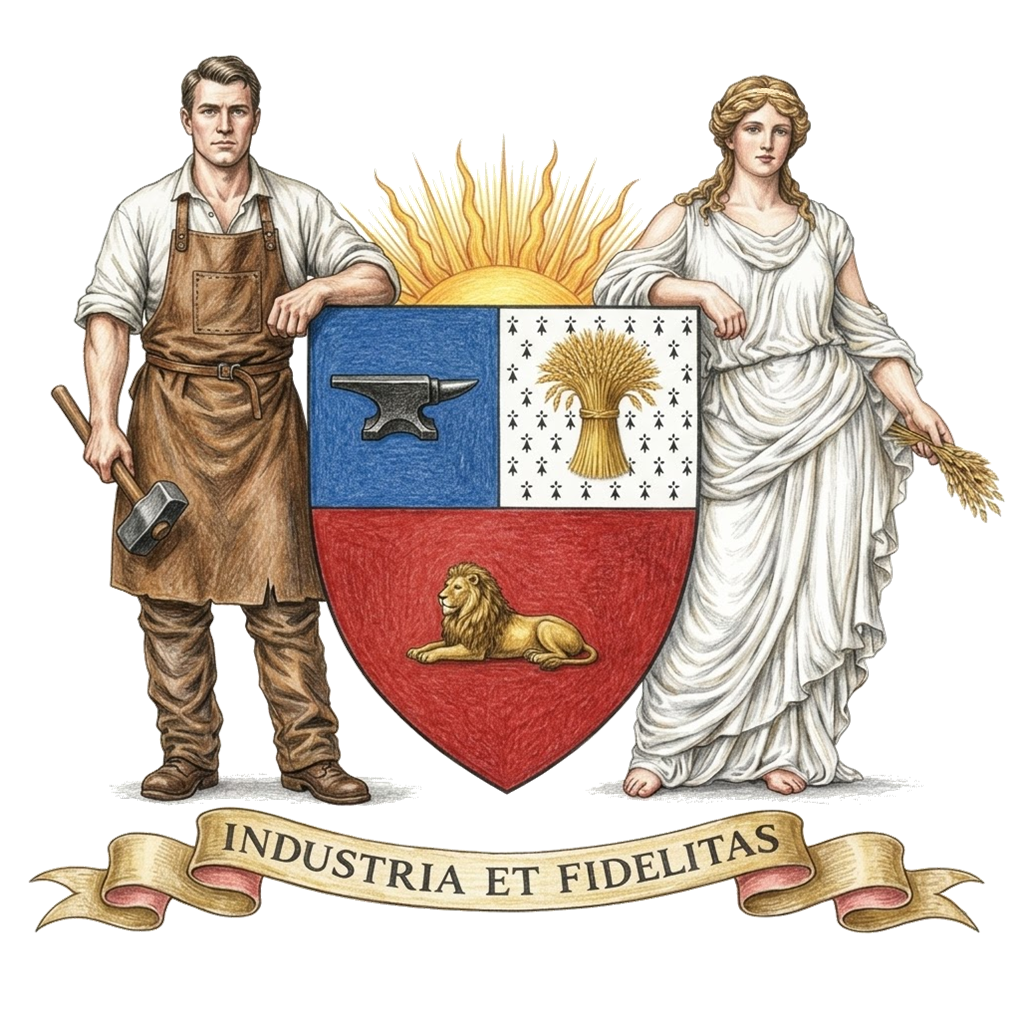
- Industry: Banking
- Founded: 19 May 1855
- Defunct: 1 March 1912
- Fate: Acquired by the Canadian Bank of Commerce
- Headquarters: 241 rue Dufferin, Sherbrooke, Quebec

The Eastern Townships Bank was a Canadian bank that existed from 1855 to 1912. Concentrated in southeastern Quebec, some branches were later opened in western provinces. In 1912, the bank was merged into the Canadian Bank of Commerce.

== Founding ==
The bank received a charter of incorporation in 1855 but did not establish operations until 1859. The authorized capital was £250,000 in 1855, increased to £400,000 in 1859. Of the latter, £206,200 was issued and £20,620 paid up by June. That July, the bank purchased a building in Sherbrooke, which was remodelled before occupation. That September, the bank opened for business at the Sherbrooke head office and Waterloo branch. The Stanstead branch opened months later.

== Regional expansion ==
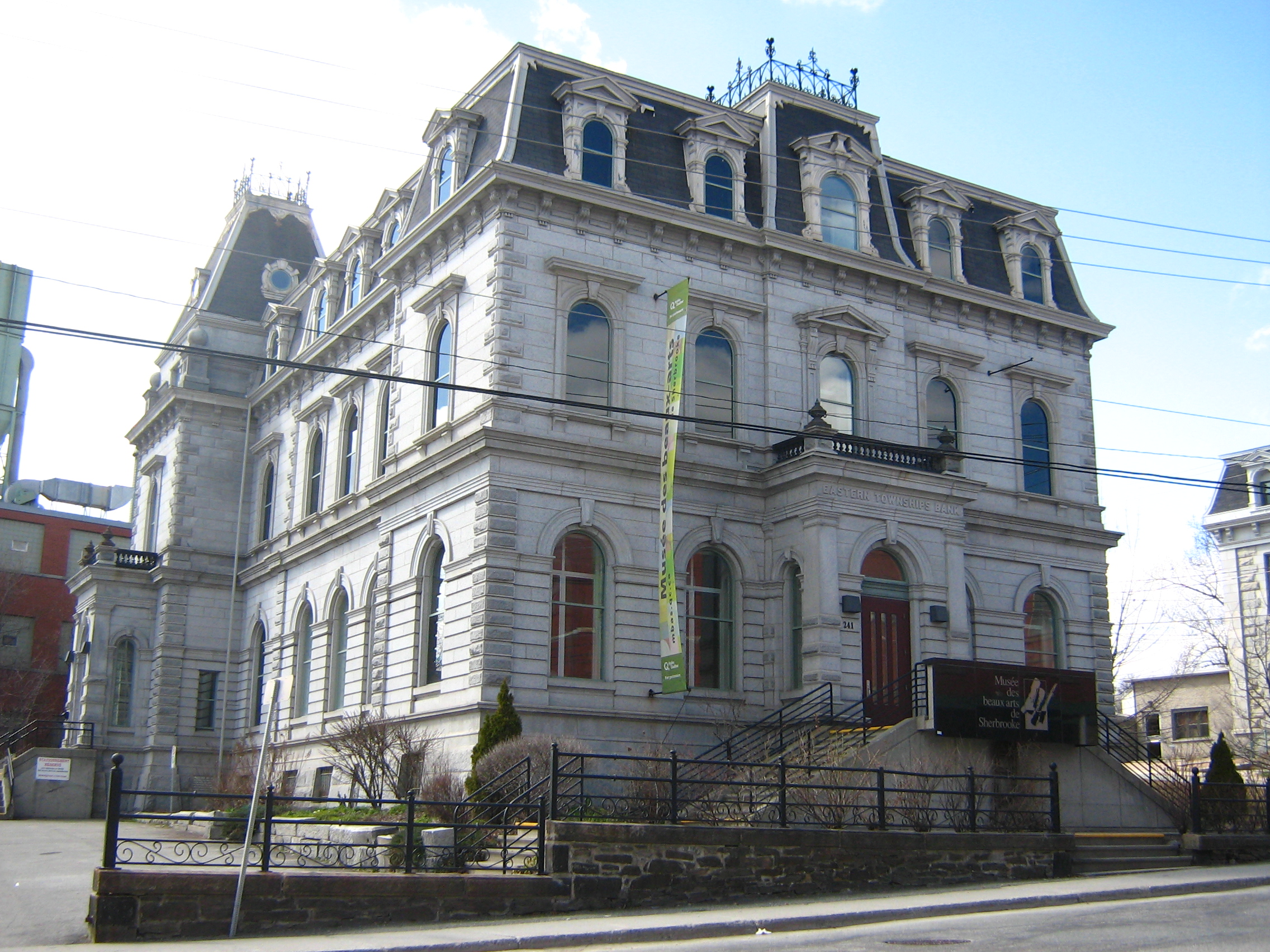
The 1874 head office in Sherbrooke, designed by James Nelson.

The authorized capital rose from $400,000 to $500,000 in 1871, to $750,000 in 1872, to $1,000,000

in 1873, and to $1,500,000 in 1875. The more grandiose head office building was completed and occupied in 1877. On the collapse of the Consolidated Bank of Canada in 1879, the Sherbrooke agency was taken over.

The Eastern Townships Bank operated 7 branches by 1879 and 12 by 1899. A prerequisite for the opening of a new branch was for the local populace to subscribe to shares in the bank. These same individuals were then encouraged to have a voice in the management of that branch. In 1895, Saint-Hyacinthe became the first branch outside the Eastern Townships. In 1900, a branch opened in Montreal.

== National expansion ==
British Columbia branches opened in Grand Forks in 1898 and Phoenix in 1900. The authorized capital rose to $2,000,000 in 1900 and $3,000,000 in 1903, all of which was issued by 1907. The 13 branches in 1900 had expanded to 64 branches and 39 agencies by 1911, which stretched to the west coast.

== Amalgamation ==
Amalgamation proposals were made by the Bank of Montreal in summer 1905 and by the Canadian Bank of Commerce in spring 1906. The latter again tried in late 1911 and this time achieved its goal of securing a strong position in Quebec. The Eastern Townships Bank understood that rejecting the offer and building its own competitive nationwide network would have required a considerable amount of fresh capital. The amalgamation occurred in 1912.

== Banknotes ==
Banknotes issued by the Eastern Townships Bank
Years	Denominations	Printer	Ref
1859 & 1861	$1, $2, $4, $5, $10, $20	American Bank Note Co.	
1873 & 1874	$4, $5, $10, $50, $100	British American Bank Note Co.	
1879–1902	$4, $5, $10, $20	British American Bank Note Co.	
1906	$5, $10	American Bank Note Co.	

== Former buildings ==
In 1965, the former Thetford Mines branch building (1910) was saved when fire destroyed the adjacent building. In 1996, the former head office in downtown Sherbrooke became the Musée des beaux-arts de Sherbrooke, an art museum.

The former Cowansville branch houses the Bruck Museum, an art and heritage museum, and the Coaticook one is a CIBC location.

Montreal branches have become premises for Scotiabank, CIBC, and H&M.

== Leadership ==
The bank's presidents were:

1. Col. Benjamin Pomroy, 1859–1874
2. Richard William Heneker, 1874–1902
3. William Farwell, 1902–1912

== Gallery of branches ==
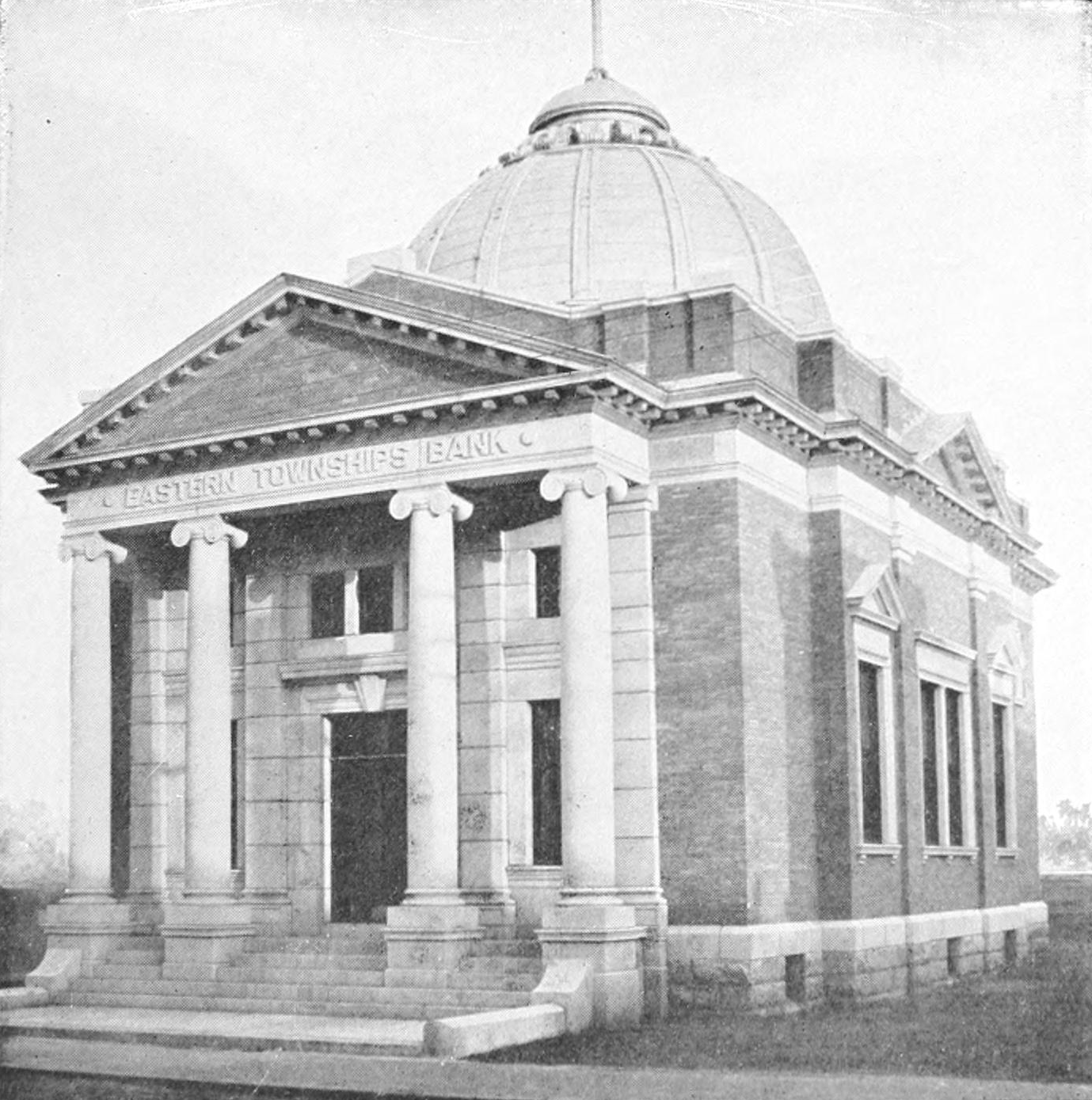
Coaticook

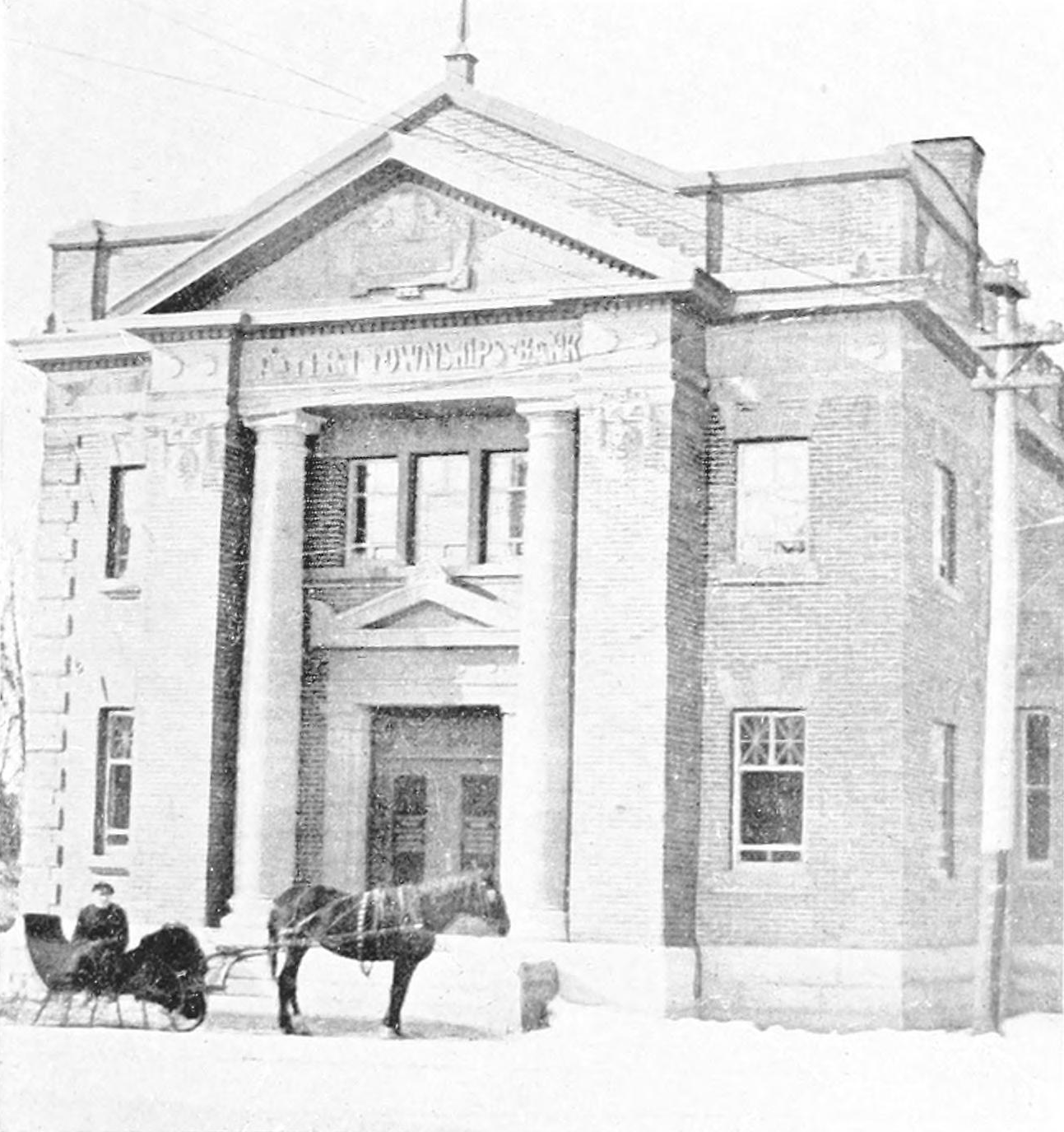
Cowansville

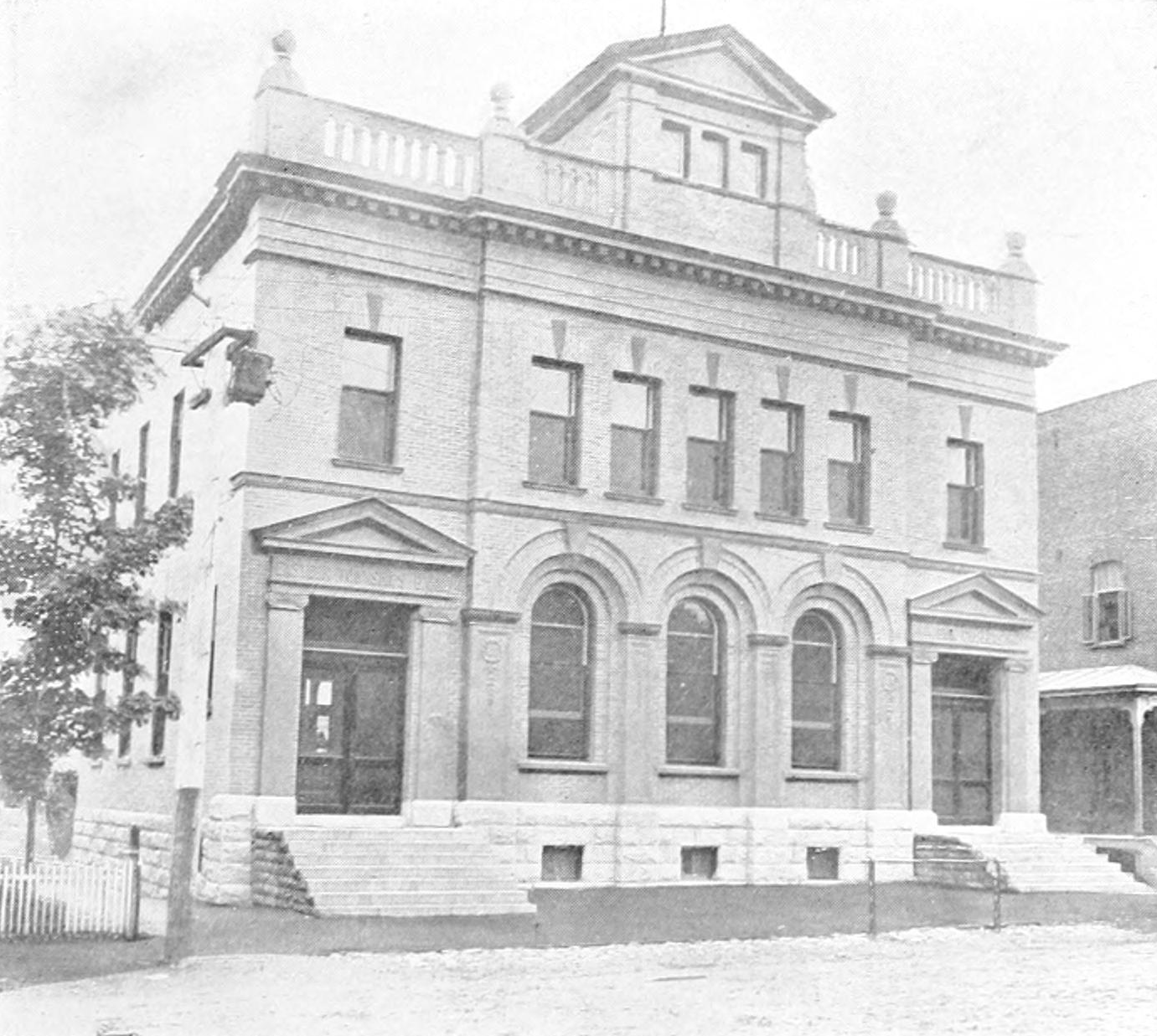
Granby

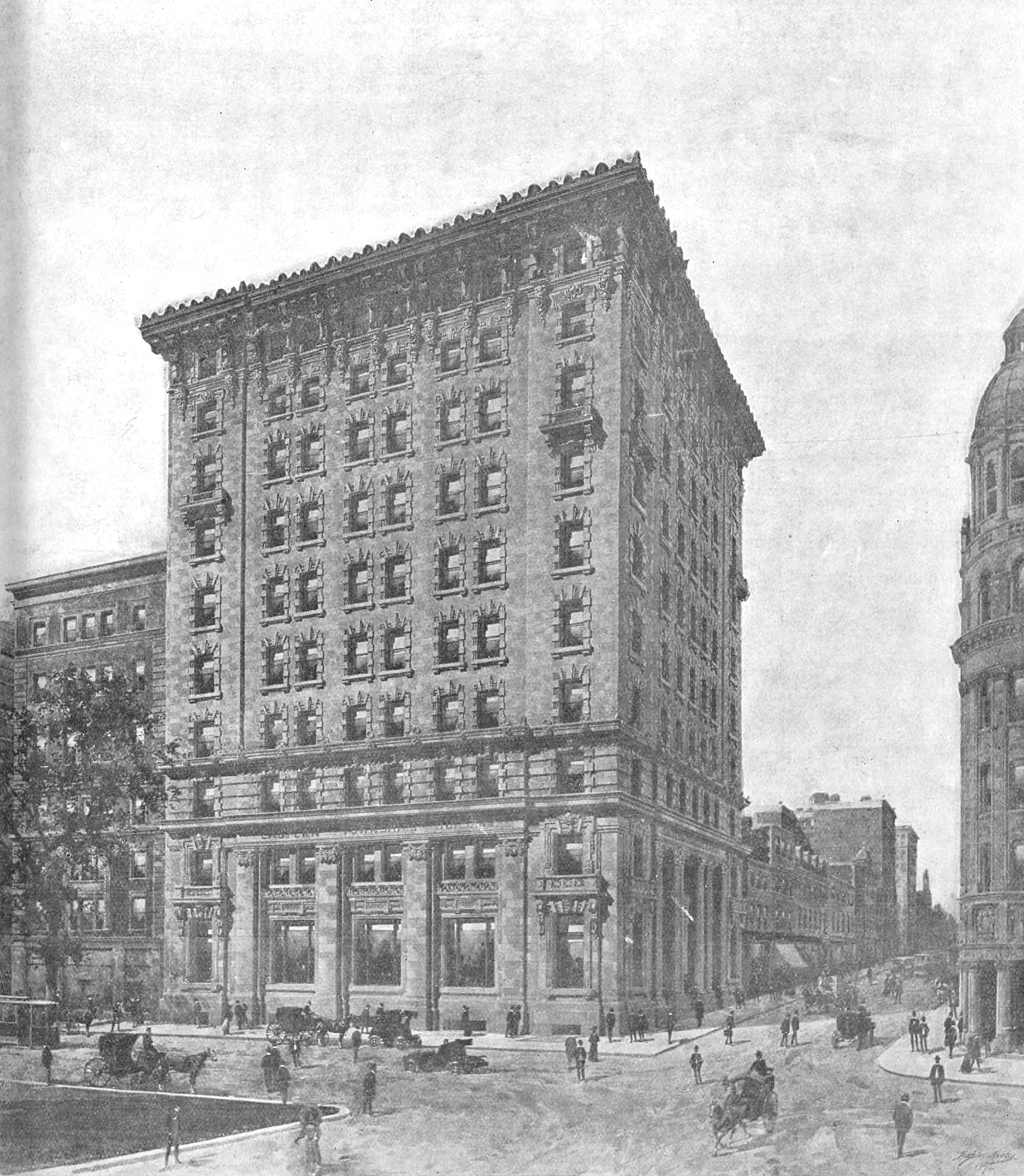
Montreal

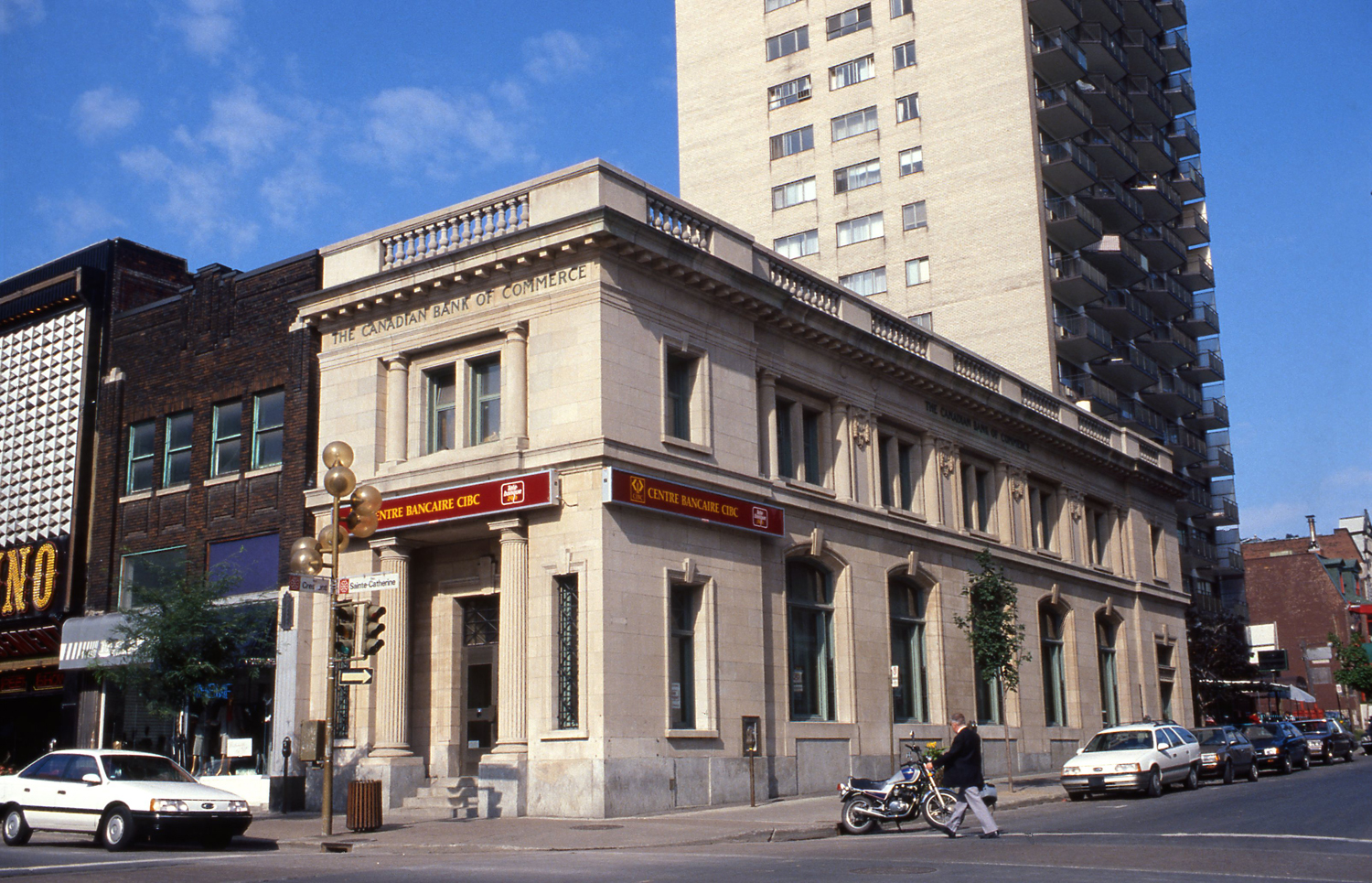
Montreal (Sainte-Catherine & Crescent)

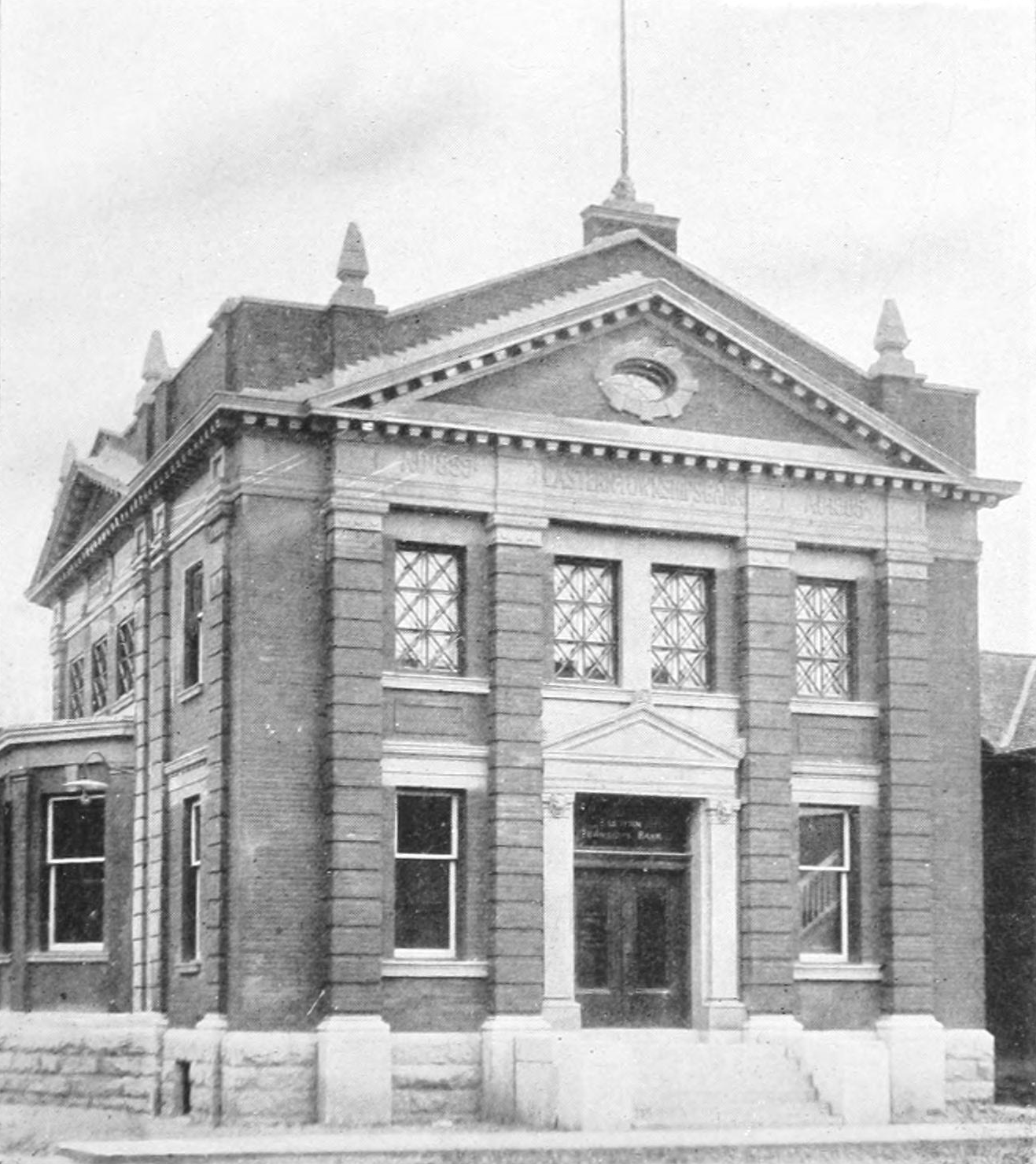
Ormstown

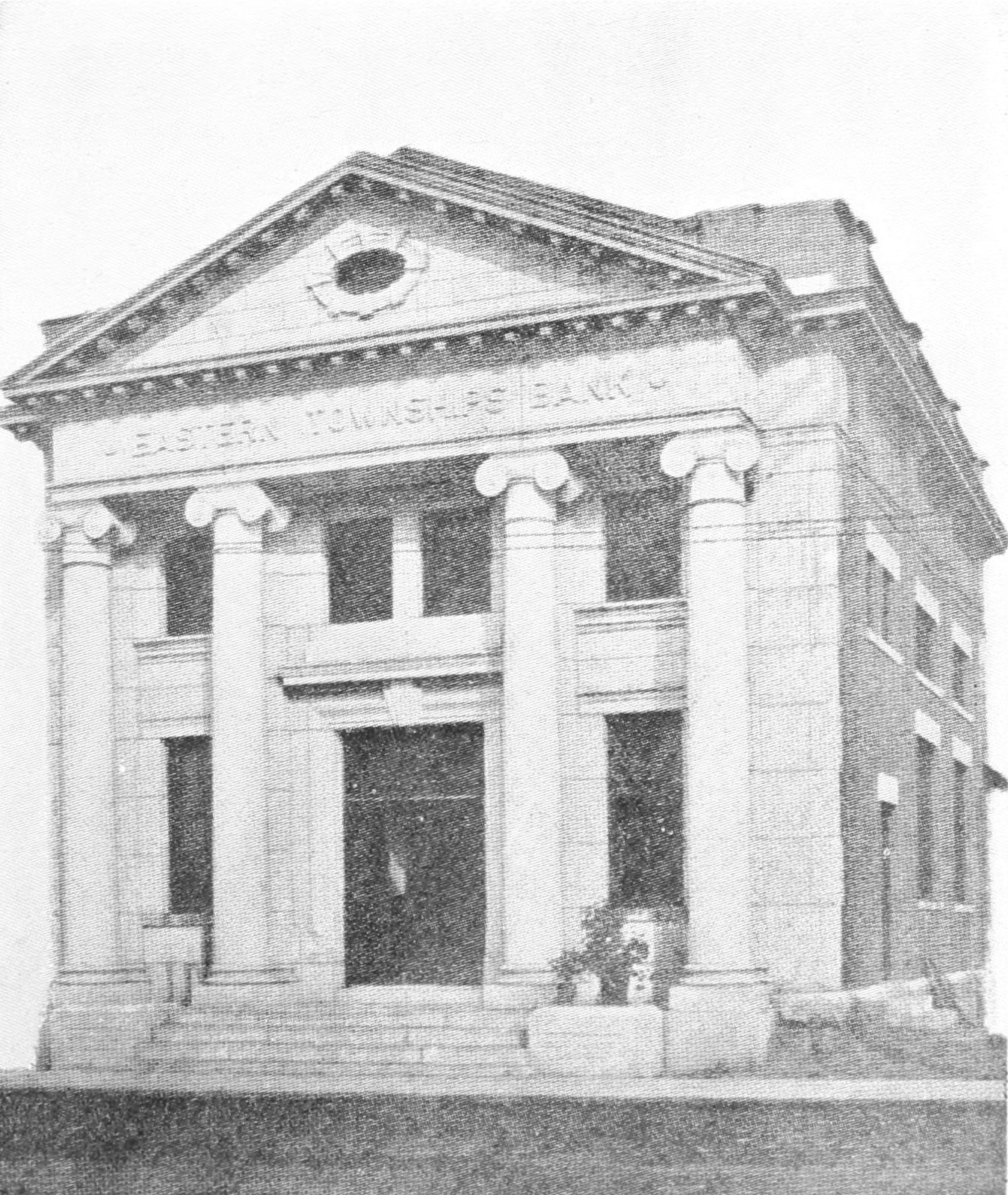
Rock Island

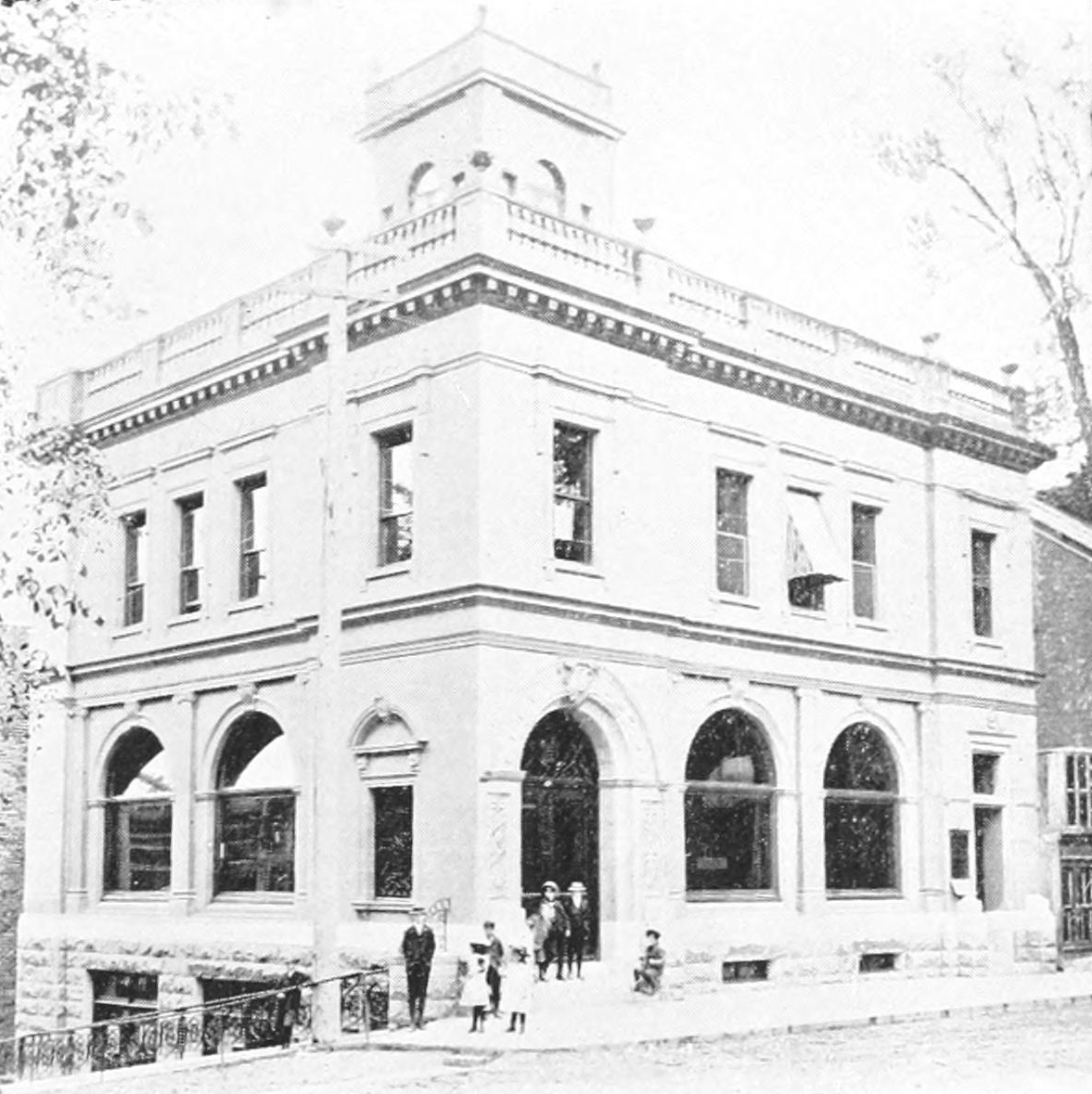
Saint-Hyacinthe

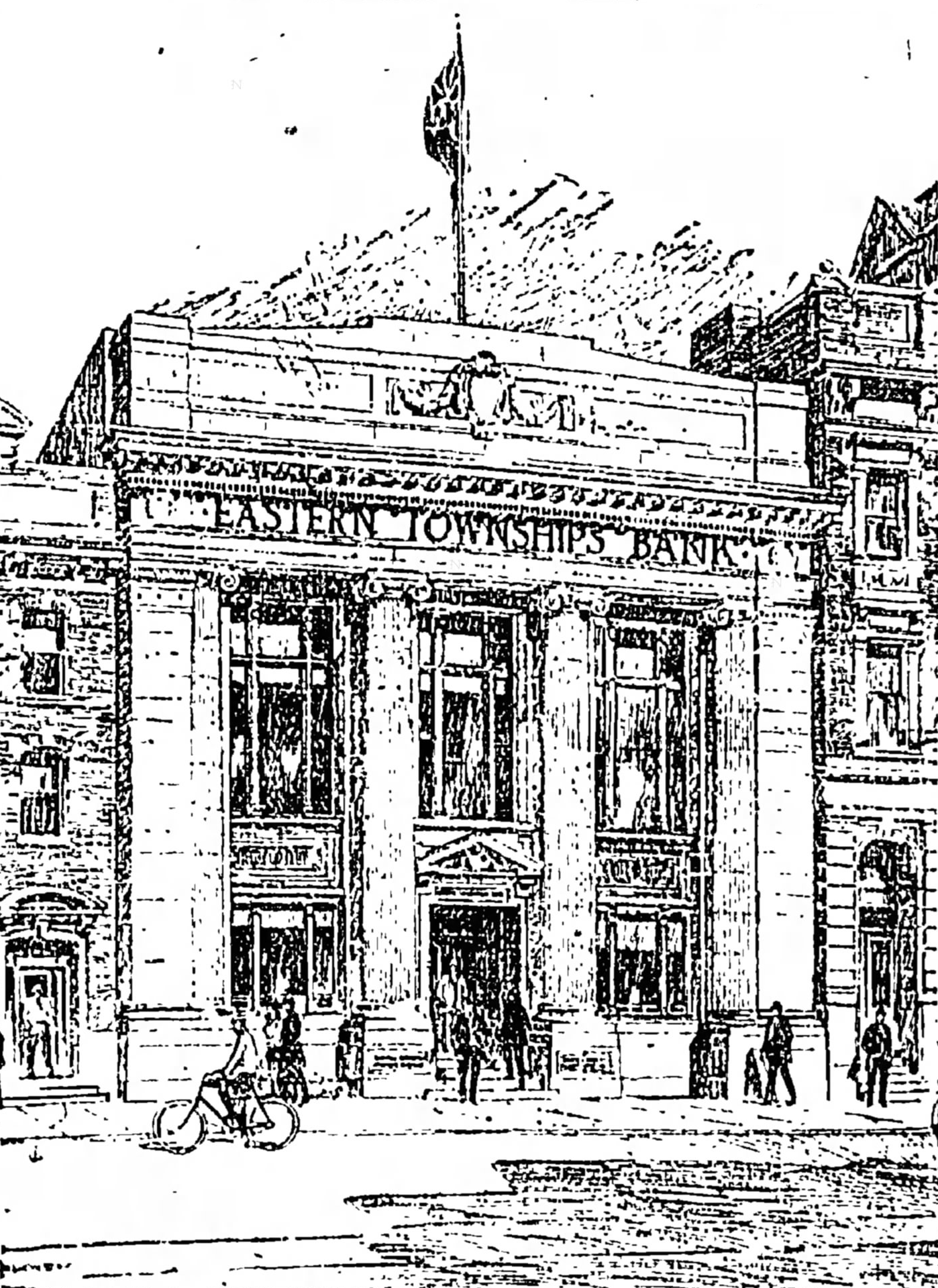
Winnipeg

== See also ==
- List of Canadian banks
