= Barclays Bank Canada =

Barclays Canada

Location: Montreal, Quebec 1929-1956
Merged with Imperial Bank of Canada in 1956
Location: Toronto, Ontario 1979-1996
Merged with Hongkong Bank of Canada in 1996
Location: Calgary, Alberta 2010–present

Barclays Bank has operated as a retail and commercial bank in Canada from 1929 to 1956, from 1979 to 1996, and most recently from 2010.

== Previous operations ==
=== Barclays Bank (Canada) ===
Barclays Bank (Canada) Limited was incorporated in Montreal, Quebec in 1929, as a joint venture between Barclays Bank Limited and Barclays Bank (Dominion, Colonial and Overseas). An office was later established in Toronto.

Like the other Canadian chartered banks, it issued its own banknotes. The Bank of Canada was established through the Bank of Canada Act of 1934 and the banks relinquished their right to issue their own currency. In 1956, Barclays Bank (Canada) was acquired by Imperial Bank of Canada, a predecessor of the Canadian Imperial Bank of Commerce, for 10% of the capital of Imperial. H.A. Stevenson was president of the bank from at least 1935 until 1950; his signature appears on one of the last currency issues by Barclays Bank (Canada) and he is quoted speaking at an annual general meeting of the bank in 1950.

=== Barclays Bank of Canada ===
The holding company, Barclays Canada Limited, which had been set up in 1927 to meet the requirements of Canadian law to foreign ownership, remained. In 1974, it was reopened to deal in the wholesale banking market. In 1979, foreign banks were allowed to receive charters and London-based Barclays Bank established a new Canadian subsidiary, Barclays Bank of Canada (French: Banque Barclays du Canada). It was reorganised into commercial banking and corporate banking divisions in 1989, and bought by the Hongkong Bank of Canada (HBC) in 1996. In 1999, HBC changed its name to HSBC Bank Canada, consistent with its parent's strategy of creating a global brand.

== Present operations ==
A non-banking subsidiary, Barclays Global Investors Canada Ltd., administers iShares and exchange-traded index funds. In 2010, Barclays Bank again applied for the right to open branches in Canada. The current operation, providing services to investment banking clients, is licensed by the Office of the Superintendent of Financial Institutions to carry on business as a foreign bank branch in Toronto and Calgary under the name Barclays Bank Plc, Canada Branch. In time, it is expected to offer full-service loans, sales, trading and research platform through Barclays Capital Canada Inc..

== See also ==
In addition to Barclays Bank of Canada, HSBC acquired the Canadian interests of other British banks, including:

- Lloyds Bank Canada
- National Westminster Bank of Canada
- Midland Bank Canada
