= Canadian Bank of Commerce =

Canadian bank (1867–1961)

- Industry: Banking
- Founded: 15 May 1867
- Founder: William McMaster
- Defunct: 1 June 1961
- Fate: Merged with the Imperial Bank of Canada
- Successor: Canadian Imperial Bank of Commerce

The Canadian Bank of Commerce was a Canadian bank that operated from 1867 to 1961. It merged in 1961 with the Imperial Bank of Canada to form the Canadian Imperial Bank of Commerce, which today is one of Canada's Big Five banks.

== History ==
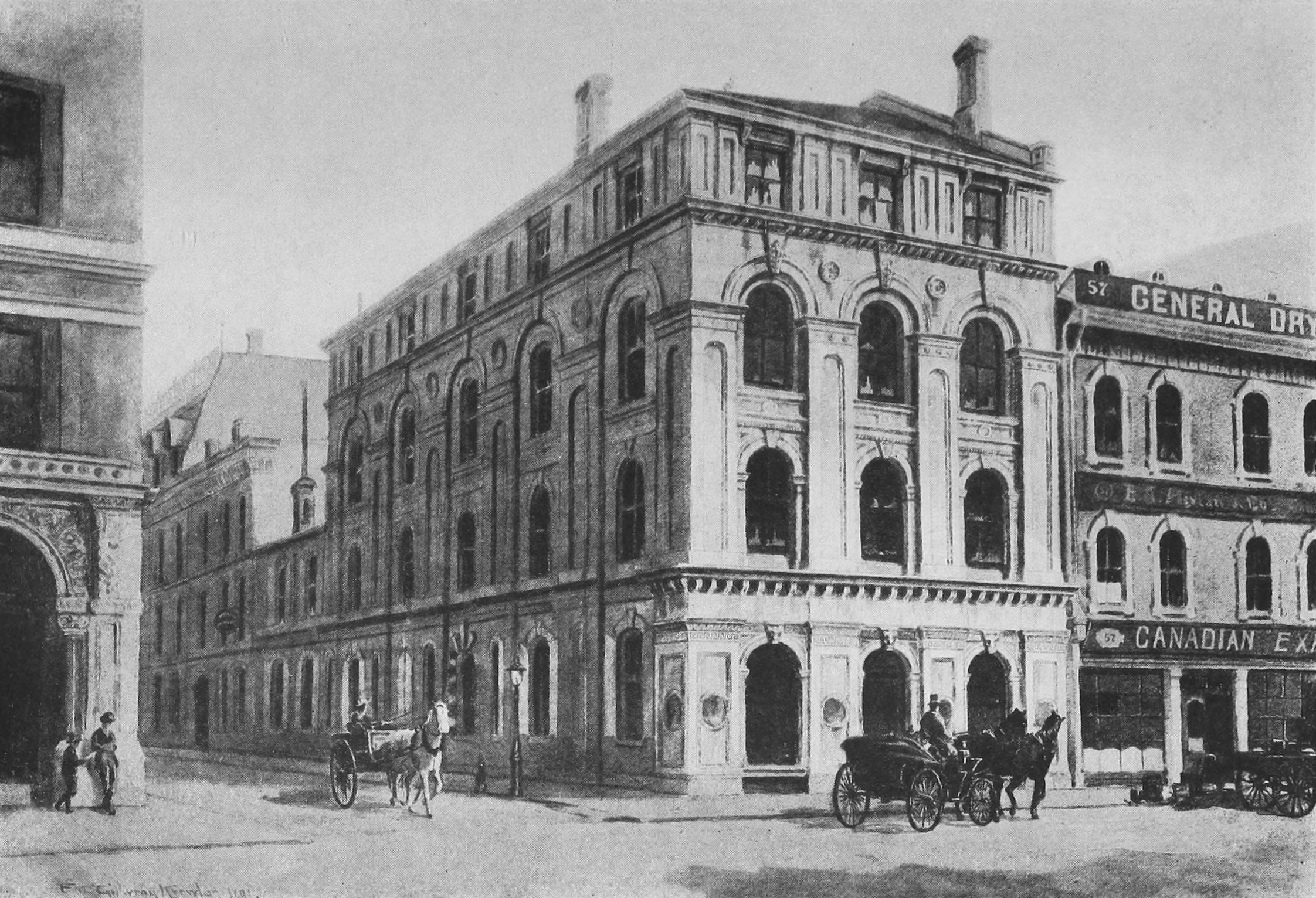
From 1867 to 1890 the bank was headquartered at 59 Yonge Street. This was the 1852 Ross, Mitchell & Co. Building, designed by William Thomas.

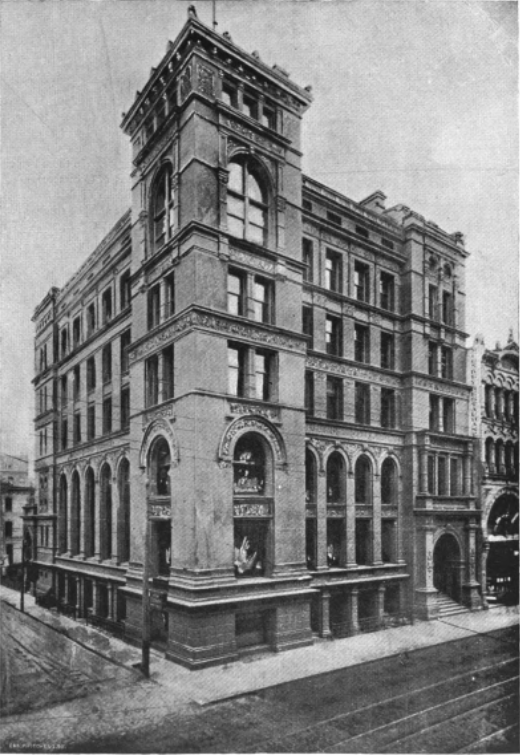
The bank's 1890 head office at 23 King Street West, designed by Richard Alfred Waite. It was demolished in 1928 to make way for the bank's new headquarters.

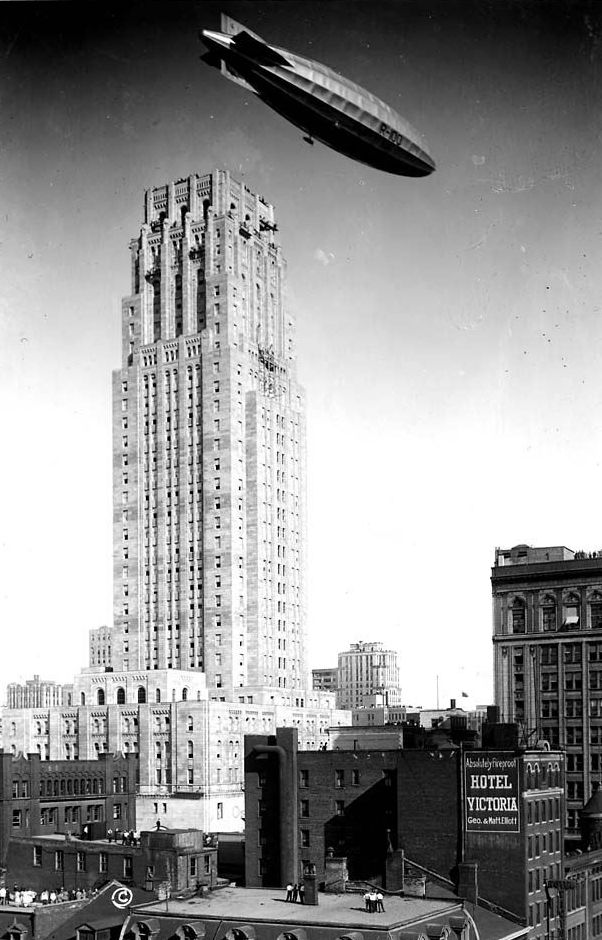
This Bank of Commerce building in Toronto was the head office from 1930 to 1961. Overhead is the R-100 airship.

In 1866 a group of businessmen, including William McMaster, purchased a charter from the defunct Bank of Canada, which had folded in 1858. The Canadian Bank of Commerce was founded the following year, issued stock, and opened its headquarters in Toronto, Ontario.

The bank soon opened branches in London, St. Catharines and Barrie. During the following years, the bank opened more branches in Ontario, and took over the business of the local Gore Bank, before expanding across Canada through the acquisition of the Bank of British Columbia in 1901 and the Halifax Banking Company in 1903.

By 1907 the Canadian Bank of Commerce had 172 branches. By the beginning of the Second World War, this had expanded to 379 branches, including a large building by Darling and Pearson in Winnipeg, Manitoba, built in 1910 in Beaux-Arts classic style.

During the First World War, 1,701 staff from the Canadian Bank of Commerce enlisted in the war effort. A memorial on the East and West Memorial Buildings in Ottawa, Ontario, is dedicated to the memory of 1701 men of the Canadian Bank of Commerce who served in the First World War. A war memorial at Commerce Court in Toronto commemorates their service.

In 1931, the Toronto headquarters of the bank, Commerce Court, designed by architects John Pearson and Frank Darling, was completed. At 34 storeys, for many years it was the tallest building in the British Empire.

Once again, during the Second World War, 2,300 staff members enlisted in the armed forces.

The Canadian Bank of Commerce merged with the Imperial Bank of Canada in 1961 to form the Canadian Imperial Bank of Commerce (CIBC), now one of the Big Five Canadian banks.

== Architecture ==
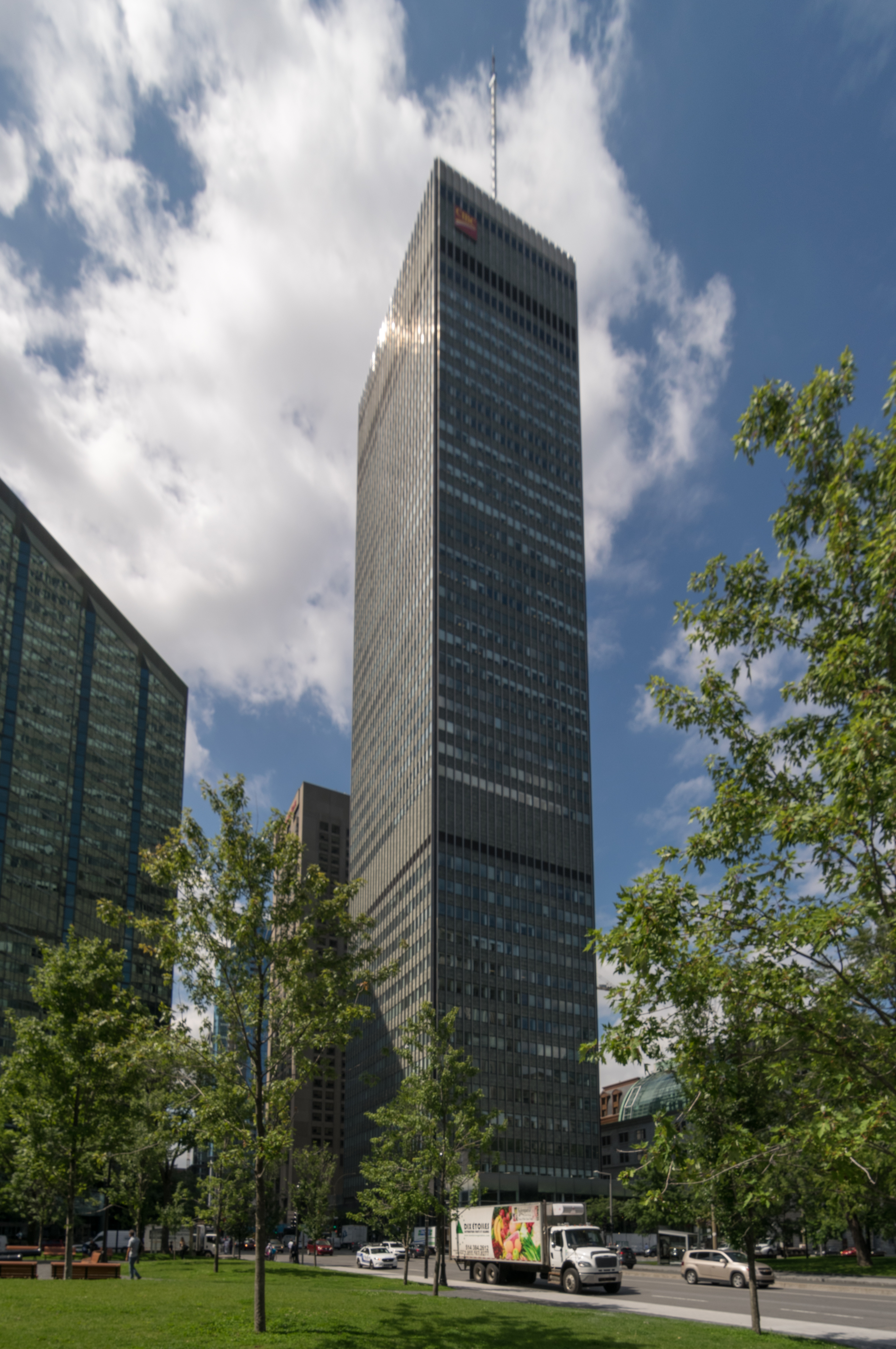
Commerce Tower in Montreal, designed by Peter Dickinson, was begun for the Bank of Commerce but was not completed until after the merger with the Imperial Bank.

The following are on the Registry of Historical Places of Canada.

- the Bank of Commerce in Nanaimo, British Columbia, built in 1914.
- the Canadian Bank of Commerce in New Westminster, British Columbia built in 1910 to 1911.
- the Bank of Commerce in Vancouver, British Columbia, built in 1914 to 1915
- the Canadian Bank of Commerce in Watson, Saskatchewan built in 1906 to 1907.
- the Bank of Commerce in Nokomis, Saskatchewan, built in 1910.
- the Bank of Commerce in Winnipeg, Manitoba, completed in 1912.
- the Bank of Commerce in Kelsey (Carrot Valley), Manitoba, built in The Pas in 1912.
- the Canadian Bank of Commerce in Innisfree, Alberta, built in 1905.
- the Canadian Bank of Commerce in Dawson, Yukon, built in 1901.

== Mergers ==
The Canadian Bank of Commerce grew through acquisitions of other banks in Canada:

- Halifax Banking Company Established in 1825 and merged with the Commerce in 1903.
- Gore Bank Formed in 1836 and merged with the Commerce in 1870.
- Eastern Townships Bank Formed in 1859 and merged with the Commerce in 1912.
- Bank of British Columbia Established with a Royal Charter in 1862 and merged with the Commerce in 1901.
- Merchants Bank of Prince Edward Island Formed Oct 6, 1871 and merged with the Commerce in 1906.
- Bank of Hamilton Bank of Hamilton merged with the Commerce in 1924.
- The Standard Bank of Canada (changed to St Lawrence Bank 1872-1876) Formed in 1876 and merged with the Commerce in 1928.

== Leadership ==
=== President ===
1. William McMaster, 18 April 1867 – 13 July 1886
2. Henry W. Darling, 13 July 1886 – 17 June 1890
3. George Albertus Cox, 17 June 1890 – 8 January 1907
4. Sir Byron Edmund Walker, 8 January 1907 – 27 March 1924
5. Sir John Aird, 25 April 1924 – 12 January 1937
6. Sydney Henry Logan, 12 January 1937 – 12 December 1944
7. Allan Edwin Arscott, 12 December 1944 – 14 December 1948
8. Stanley Musgrave Wedd, 14 December 1948 – 31 October 1952
9. James Stewart, 31 October 1952 – 11 December 1956
10. Neil John McKinnon, 11 December 1956 – 31 May 1961

=== Chairman of the Board ===
1. Sir Joseph Flavelle, 25 April 1924 – 11 January 1938
2. Sir William Thomas White, 11 January 1938 – 12 December 1944
3. Sydney Henry Logan, 12 December 1944 – 14 December 1948
4. Allen Edwin Arscott, 14 December 1948 – 14 October 1952
5. Stanley Musgrave Wedd, 31 October 1952 – 11 December 1956
6. James Stewart, 11 December 1956 – 8 December 1959
7. Neil John McKinnon, 8 December 1959 – 30 May 1961

== Bank histories ==
- Ross, Victor. A History of the Canadian Bank of Commerce: Volume 1. Oxford University Press, 1920.
- Ross, Victor. A History of the Canadian Bank of Commerce: Volume 2. Oxford University Press, 1922.
- Trigge, Arthur St Lawrence. A History of the Canadian Bank of Commerce: Volume 3, 1919-1930. Oxford University Press, 1934.
- Edinborough, Arnold. A History of the Canadian Imperial Bank of Commerce: Volume 4, 1931-1973. Canadian Imperial Bank of Commerce, 1995.
- McQueen, Rod. A History of the Canadian Imperial Bank of Commerce: Volume 5, 1973-1999. ECW Press, 2021.

== See also ==
- List of Canadian banks
- Barcelona Traction was known locally as "the Canadian one" since the bank was its main shareholder.
