= Imperial Bank of Canada =

Canadian bank (1873–1961)

- Formerly: Imperial Bank
- Industry: Banking
- Founded: 1873 in Toronto, Ontario, Canada
- Founder: Henry Stark Howland
- Defunct: June 1, 1961
- Fate: Merged with the Canadian Bank of Commerce
- Successor: Canadian Imperial Bank of Commerce

The Imperial Bank of Canada was a Canadian bank that operated from 1873 to 1961. In 1961, Imperial merged with the Canadian Bank of Commerce to become the Canadian Imperial Bank of Commerce.

== History ==
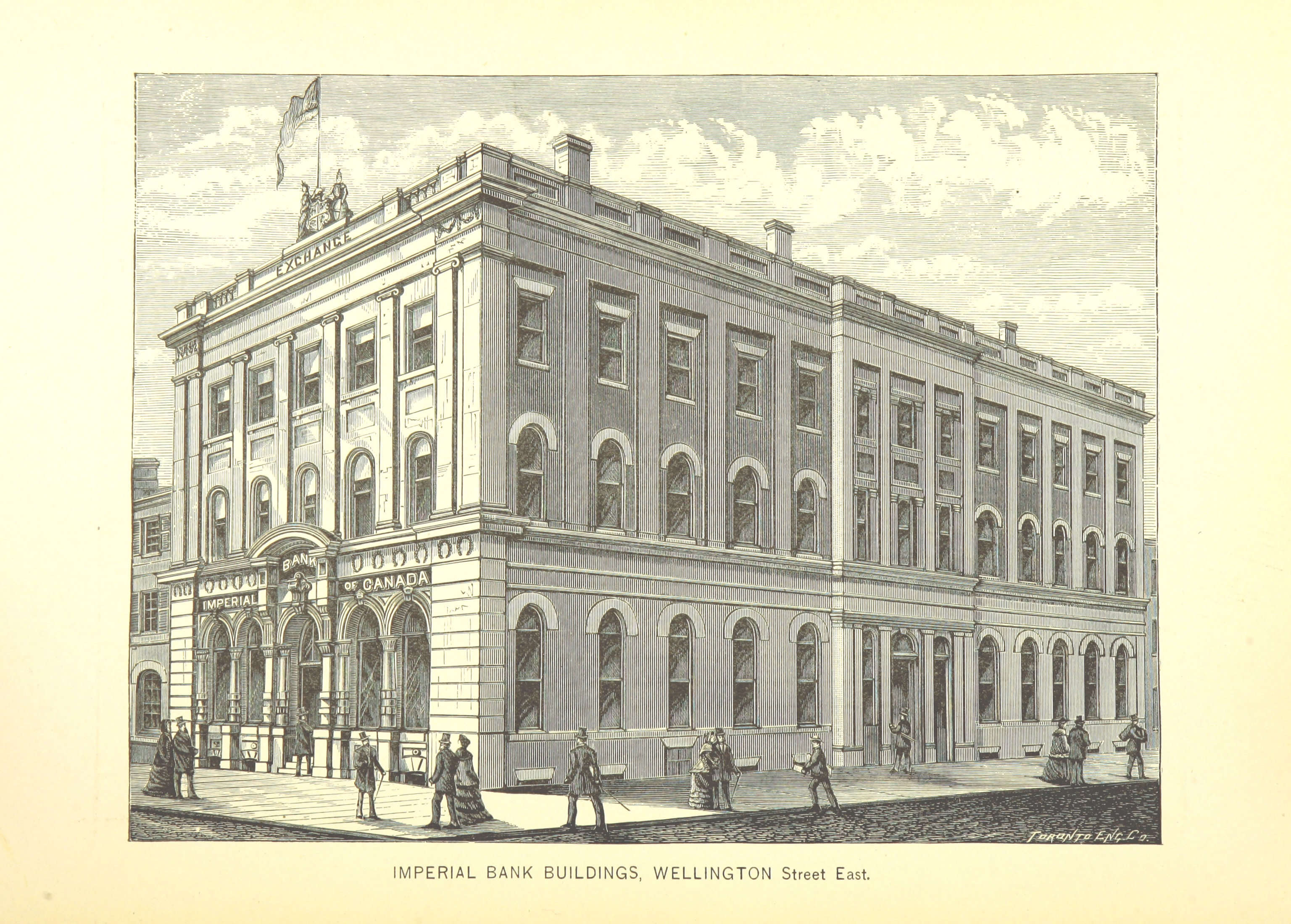
From 1876 to 1936, the bank was headquartered in the Exchange Building at 32 Wellington.

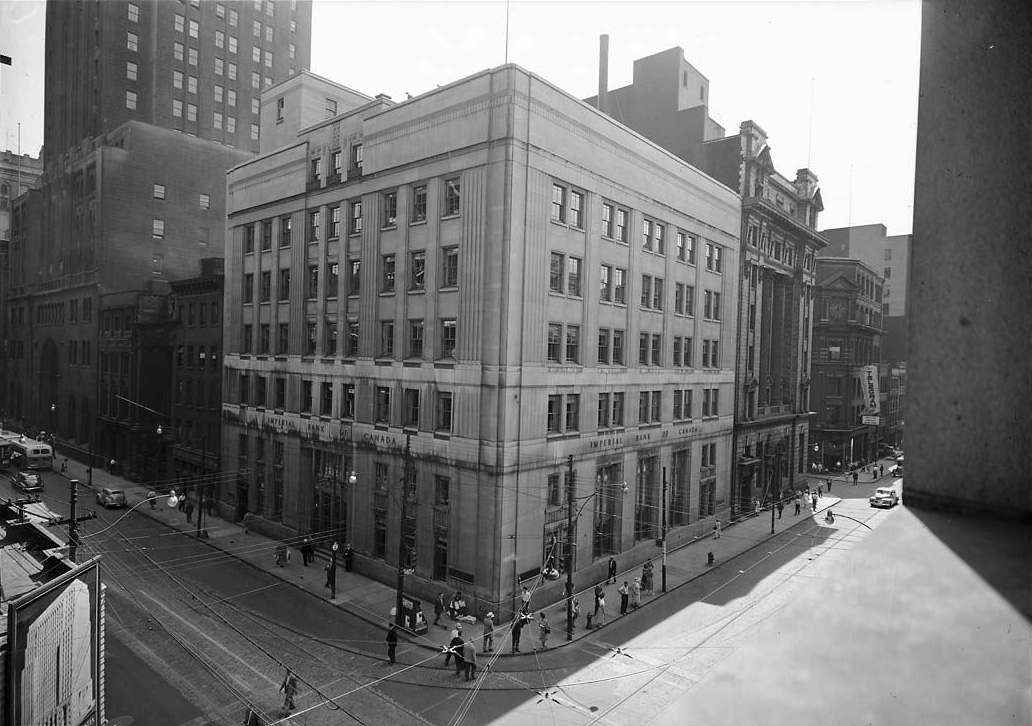
Imperial's headquarters in Toronto, designed by Ernest Ross Rolph, opened in 1936.

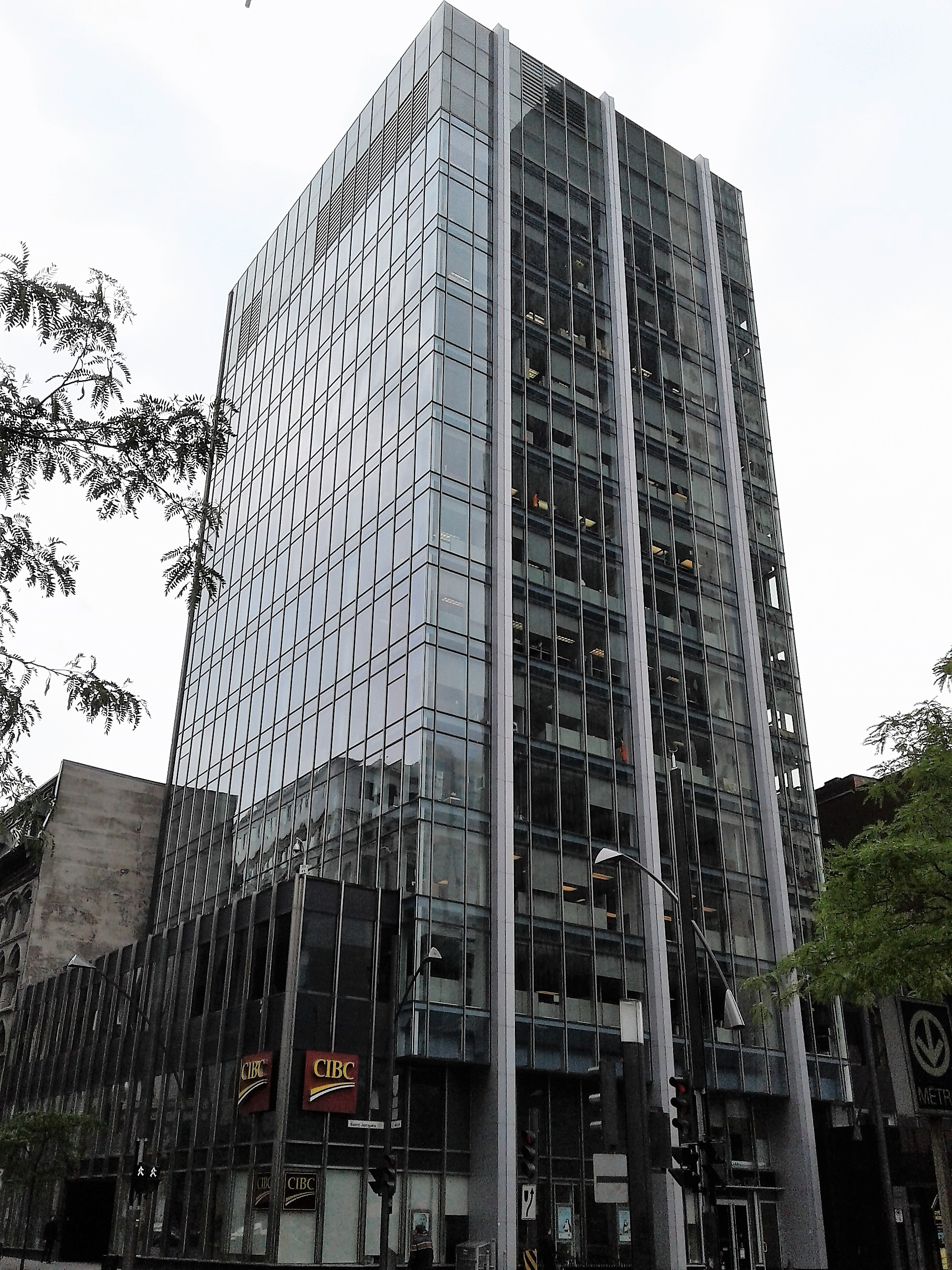
Construction of the new Montreal office at 612 St James, designed by Ross, Fish, Duschenes & Barrett, began in 1960. However, given the merger in June 1961, the bank sold the building before it was completed.

It was founded in 1873 as the Imperial Bank in Toronto by Henry Stark Howland, former vice president of the Canadian Bank of Commerce. The bank became the Imperial Bank of Canada in 1874.

In 1875, the president of the Imperial Bank of Canada was H.S. Howland, founder of the original Imperial Bank. The bank had a capital of $1,000,000 and the head office was located on Wellington Street in Toronto, Ontario.

The Imperial Bank of Canada branches expanded beyond Toronto and were found in St. Catharines, Ingersoll, Welland, Prince Albert, Saskatchewan and Port Colborne.

In 1875, it amalgamated with the Niagara District Bank, which had been chartered on May 19, 1855, in Montreal.

Although George Albertus Cox became the bank's president in 1890, Howland stayed at the bank until his death in 1902. Cox remained president until 1906. Daniel Robert Wilkie succeeded Cox as president of the Imperial Bank of Canada, and died as president in 1914.

The bank acquired Weyburn Security Bank in 1931, and Barclays Bank (Canada) in 1956.

It merged with the Canadian Bank of Commerce in 1961 to form the Canadian Imperial Bank of Commerce.

== Leadership ==
=== President ===
1. Henry Stark Howland, 1875–1890
2. George Albertus Cox, 1890–1906
3. Daniel Robert Wilkie, 1906–1914
4. Peleg Howland, 1914–1930
5. Frank Augustus Rolph, 1930–1936
6. Albert Edmund Phipps, 1936–1943
7. Robert Stanley Waldie, 1943–1948
8. William Gibb More, 1948–1950
9. Iredell Killaly Johnston, 1950–1953
10. Lindsay Stuart Mackersy, 1953–1956
11. John Stewart Proctor, 1956–1961

=== Chairman of the Board ===
1. Frank Augustus Rolph, 1936–1941
2. Albert Edmund Phipps, 1943–1945
3. Robert Stanley Waldie, 1948–1956
4. Lindsay Stuart Mackersy, 1956–1961

== See also ==
- List of Canadian banks
