= CIBC (disambiguation) =

CIBC is the Canadian Imperial Bank of Commerce.

CIBC may also refer to:

== Finance ==
- Canadian Imperial Bank of Commerce:
  - CIBC Bank USA
  - CIBC FirstCaribbean International Bank
  - CIBC Mellon
  - CIBC Oppenheimer
  - CIBC Retail Markets
  - CIBC Wealth Management
  - CIBC World Markets
  - CIBC Wood Gundy
  - CIBC Argosy Merchant Funds, now known as Trimaran Capital Partners
- CIBC Building:
  - 20 Exchange Place, New York City, has been known by many names, including CIBC Building, New York
  - Bank of Commerce (Halifax), a.k.a. CIBC Building, in Nova Scotia, Canada
  - Bank of Commerce Building, Windsor, a.k.a. CIBC Building, in Ontario, Canada
  - CIBC 750 Lawrence in Toronto, Canada
  - Old Canadian Bank of Commerce Building, Montreal was CIBC's main office in Montreal prior to the move to Tour CIBC
  - La Tour CIBC, a.k.a. CIBC Tower and CIBC Building, in Montreal, Canada

== Radio stations ==
- CIBC-FM 98.1, a radio station in Cowessess, Saskatchewan, Canada
- CIRX-FM 94.3, a radio station in Prince George, British Columbia, Canada that previously held the CIBC-FM call sign

== Religion ==
- Church of India, Burma and Ceylon (CIBC)
