= Gerald T. McCaughey =

Canadian businessman (born 1956)

- Born: 14 March 1956 (age 70); Winnipeg, Manitoba
- Education: Concordia University (BCom)
- Spouse: Joanne (partner)

Gerald Thomas McCaughey (born 14 March 1956) is a Canadian businessman who was formerly president and CEO of the Canadian Imperial Bank of Commerce.

== Early years ==
McCaughey was born and grew up in Winnipeg and attended parish schools before moving to Montreal in 1970.

At 17 McCaughey left home, spending his summers working on the railway tunnels in the British Columbia Interior from 1973 to 1976, and his winters studying at Concordia University. McCaughey graduated with a bachelor of commerce degree and took further bookkeeping courses, while working at a meat packing plant in Montreal. He joined Merrill Lynch Canada as broker in 1981.

== Career ==
At Merrill Lynch McCaughey worked his way across the company's operations in Winnipeg, Edmonton and Montreal.

In 1990 Merrill Lynch sold their private client operations in Canada to CIBC, McCaughey was an account executive and joined CIBC Wood Gundy. McCaughey eventually succeeded Tony de Werth as the head of Wood Gundy, the retail brokerage division of CIBC. McCaughey sold off USA brokerage Oppenheimer, sold the Guernsey operations, acquired TAL Global Asset Management, and purchased Merrill Lynch's Canadian brokerage (formerly Midland Walwyn Inc.).

Since joining CIBC, McCaughey has risen up the ranks within the bank:

- 1994–1999 President of Wood Gundy Private Client Investments
- 1999–2002 Senior executive vice-president (Wealth Management)
- 2002–2004 Vice chair, CIBC
- 2004–2005 Chairman and chief executive officer, CIBC World Markets
- 2005–2005 President and chief operating officer, CIBC
- 2005–2014 President and chief executive officer, CIBC

As a result of several scandals with CIBC World Markets, McCaughey replaced David Kassie as chairman and chief executive officer of CIBC World Markets, while also retaining his existing responsibilities for wealth management. Kassie was initially seen as the next CEO of CIBC prior to the problems with World Markets, and shortly after departing CIBC he went on to found Genuity which led to accusations and a lawsuit for allegedly poaching senior World Markets staff.

In 2005, McCaughey became president and chief operating officer of CIBC, making him the heir-apparent to CEO John Hunkin, while Brian Shaw succeeded McCaughey as chairman and chief executive officer of CIBC World Markets. In July 2005, McCaughey became chief executive officer when Hunkin's retirement date was pushed forward. In 2008, Richard Nesbitt replaced Shaw as chairman and chief executive officer of CIBC World Markets. On June 11, 2013, Nesbitt was named chief operating officer of CIBC while also retaining his responsibility for World Markets.

On April 24, 2014, CIBC announced that McCaughey would be retiring as CEO effective April 30, 2016, having "secured a period of up to two years of continuing leadership from him should it be required for an orderly transition while providing for the potential of an earlier retirement date should a successor for Mr. McCaughey be identified and ready to assume leadership of CIBC before that time". On July 31, 2014, CIBC announced the appointment of Victor Dodig as president and CEO which would be effective on September 15, 2014, which accelerated McCaughey and Nesbitt's retirements to September 15, 2014.

=== Compensation ===
McCaughey was paid $6.24 million in total direct compensation in 2009, according to the company's most recent annual proxy circular.

The Canadian Press reported on Thursday March 17, 2011, 8:36 pm EDT that "President and chief executive Gerald McCaughey's pay increased 50 per cent to $9.34 million last year."

== Non-Banking Activities ==
Outside of banking, McCaughey serves various other boards:

- Chair of the advisory board for the Canada Institute of the Woodrow Wilson International Center for Scholars
- Director of the Frontier College Foundation
- Member of The Learning Partnership's Corporate Advisory Board
- Member of the U.S. Council on Foreign Relations

In 2012 he was included in the 50 Most Influential list of Bloomberg Markets Magazine.

== Personal ==
McCaughey is one of five siblings born to Thomas McCaughey, a retired anesthetist (who now spends most of his time in Nepal) and French Canadian mother (his parents divorced in 1976).

McCaughey lives in the downtown core of Toronto with longtime partner Joanne, an interior designer. They do not have any children. He reportedly does not own a car and lives in a modest condo.
