= Al Flood =

Canadian banker (1935–2025)

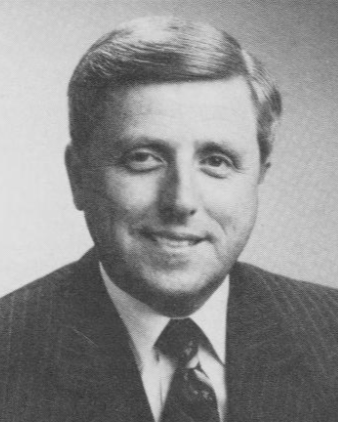
- Born: 22 August 1935; Monkton, Ontario, Canada
- Died: 2 September 2025 (aged 90); Toronto, Ontario, Canada
- Spouse: Rolande Blanchard (m. 1960)

Alvin Lloyd Flood (22 August 1935 – 2 September 2025) was a Canadian banker who served from 1992 to 1999 as chairman of the Canadian Imperial Bank of Commerce. Flood joined the Canadian Bank of Commerce in 1951 in his hometown as a teller. He worked at various branches in Ontario until 1974, when he received his first executive posting. For the next decade he worked in the bank's international operations, before joining the head office in Toronto in 1984 as an executive vice-president. In 1986, the bank split its presidency into four roles, and Flood was made president of the corporate banking division. He remained a president until June 1992, when he succeeded R. Donald Fullerton as chairman and chief executive officer. In the spring of 1998, Flood negotiated a proposed merger with the Toronto-Dominion Bank, which was barred in December that year by finance minister Paul Martin. After the failed merger, he announced his retirement in January 1999, and retired that June.

== Life and career ==
Flood was born in Monkton, Ontario on 22 August 1935, to George Wesley Flood (1894–1990) and Susan May Dawson (1898–1946). He had four older brothers.

Flood began working for the Canadian Bank of Commerce in Monkton in 1951 at age 16. Over the ensuing decades, he held a number of management positions in corporate and credit operations at branches around Ontario, including London, Ottawa, and Toronto. In 1973, Flood attended the Program for Management Development at Harvard University.

In 1974, the bank appointed him area executive for the United States and Latin America, and in 1978 he became general manager for the region. In 1979 he became vice-president for corporate banking, and in 1980 vice-president for U.S. operations. In 1983 he became senior vice-president for U.S. operations, and later that year became head of international operations. In 1984 he was made an executive vice president and joined the head office in Toronto.

In May 1986, CIBC president R. Donald Fullerton split the presidency into three roles, while remaining chairman of the board himself. Paul Cantor became president of investment banking, Flood became president of corporate banking, and Warren Moysey became president of individual banking. The bank later added a fourth president, T. Iain Ronald, in charge of administrative banking. In May 1989, the four presidents were elected directors of the bank. In April 1992, Flood was elected to succeed Fullerton as chairman and chief executive officer, effective 7 June. Upon Flood's accession to the chair, Cantor resigned from the bank. Concurrently, Flood merged the corporate and investment banking arms into a single unit headed by John S. Hunkin, placed Holger Kluge in charge of the individual banking unit, and phased out the administrative banking unit.

In the spring of 1998, Flood worked with A. Charles Baillie, chairman of the Toronto-Dominion Bank, to orchestrate a merger of their banks. The new bank would retain the CIBC name while adopting the green colours of TD. The announcement of the merger was made on 17 April 1998, and came three months after the Royal Bank of Canada and Bank of Montreal had announced a planned merger. However, in December 1998, finance minister Paul Martin barred both mergers.

With his merger having failed, in January 1999, Flood announced that he would retire that year. The announcement set off a battle between Hunkin and Kluge for the chairmanship. On 1 April of that year, the bank's 28 directors met to elect Flood's successor. The two competitors had struck a kind of suicide pact, whereby the loser would leave the bank. After Hunkin won the vote, Kluge announced his resignation. Flood retired on 3 June.

On 10 September 1960 at the Paroisse St-Jacques in Embrun, Ontario, Flood married Rolande T. Blanchard. They have four children.

Flood died in Toronto on 2 September 2025, at the age of 90.
