= Bank of Commerce Building =

Bank of Commerce Building may refer to:

- Bank of Commerce Building (Oregon City, Oregon)
- Bank of Commerce Building (Windsor, Ontario)
