= Jeff Rubin =

Canadian economist and author (born August 24, 1954)

Jeff Rubin (born August 24, 1954) is a Canadian economist and author. He is a former chief economist at CIBC World Markets and is currently a senior fellow at the Centre for International Governance Innovation.

Rubin had worked at CIBC World Markets and its predecessors since 1988, and served as chief economist from 1992 to 2009, when he resigned.

== Education and early career ==
Rubin received a B.A. in Economics at the University of Toronto and an M.A. from McGill University. He then worked as an economist in the Ontario Government Treasury Department where he was responsible for projecting future interest rates.

== Economic forecasts ==
In 1988, Rubin moved on to the brokerage firm Wood Gundy which was taken over by CIBC and became first CIBC Wood Gundy and then CIBC World Markets. He has accurately predicted fluctuations in interest rates and the value of the Canadian dollar. In the early 1990s he came to prominence projecting a major decline in the Ontario real estate market. He was one of the first economists to accurately predict soaring oil prices in 2000 and is now a popular commentator on oil depletion and its economic repercussions. However, in 2008, when a barrel of oil was $135, Rubin predicted that the price will reach $225 by 2012. This prediction turned out to be wrong with the price of oil crashing in 2009, which – despite a rebound from 2011 to 2014 – stayed relatively low until 2016.

== Publications ==
Rubin writes a blog published every Wednesday for The Globe and Mail newspaper. The blog is also published in the Huffington Post. He is an avid fisherman and frequently uses fishing analogies in his writing.

Rubin wrote the 2009 book Why Your World Is About to Get a Whole Lot Smaller: Oil and the End of Globalization (ISBN 0-307-35751-1), which won the Canadian Business Book of the Year award. The book was also published with U.S. and U.K editions along with editions in French, Spanish, German, Portuguese, and Italian. A second Canadian edition was published in 2010. Jeff Rubin's second book, The End of Growth - but is that all bad? published by Random House (ISBN 978-0-307-36090-8), was released in Canada in a hard cover edition on May 8, 2012. It follows up on the theme of how oil prices are changing the world. The End of Growth was released in a US edition on October 16, 2012, under the title "The Big Flatline - Oil and the No-Growth Economy" (ISBN 978-0-230-34218-7). A third book published by Random House and titled "The Carbon Bubble - What Happens to us When it Bursts" was released in Canada on May 12, 2015. A fourth book published by Random House and titled "The Expendables - How the Middle Class Got Screwed By Globalization" was released in Canada on August 18, 2020. "A Map of the New Normal: How Inflation, War and Sanctions Will Change Your World Forever" was released in May, 2024. This book explores how central banks' actions during COVID-19 lockdowns set economies on track for massive inflation, in commodities and in wages. Rubin argues that the return of industrial production from low wage countries such as China strengthens the bargaining position of workers, particularly unionized blue collar labor. He writes that grain may become as important as oil, suggesting that Russia could decide to sell its grain only to countries that support its military agenda.

== List of works ==
- Why Your World Is About to Get a Whole Lot Smaller: Oil and the End of Globalization (2009)
- The End of Growth (2012)
- The Carbon Bubble: What Happens to Us When It Bursts (2015)
- The Expendables: How the Middle Class Got Screwed By Globalization (2020)
- A Map of the New Normal: How Inflation, War and Sanctions Will Change Your World Forever (2024)
