= Donald Fullerton =

Donald Fullerton may refer to:

- Donald B. Fullerton (1892–1985), American Christian missionary and teacher
- R. Donald Fullerton (1931–2011), Canadian banker
