= Paul Cantor (disambiguation) =

Paul Cantor (1945–2022) was an American literary and media critic.

Paul Cantor may also refer to:

- Paul Cantor (Canadian lawyer) (1942–2018), Canadian lawyer and executive

== See also ==
- Paul Canter, co-founder of video game developer Vortex Software
- Paul Kantor (disambiguation)
