= Bugaboo Creek Steakhouse =

Defunct American steakhouse chain

- Type: Wholly owned subsidiary
- Industry: Restaurants
- Genre: Casual dining
- Founded: October 1992; 34 years ago
- Founders: Edward P. Grace
- Defunct: June 2016; 10 years ago
- Fate: Bankruptcy
- Headquarters: East Providence, Rhode Island, United States
- Number of locations: 31 (at peak)
- Area served: United States
- Products: Canadian themed American cuisine
- Parent: Trimaran Capital Partners
- Website: web.archive.org/web/20160314200826/https://www.bugaboocreek.com/

Bugaboo Creek Steakhouse was a Canadian-themed casual steakhouse chain that operated in the Eastern United States from 1992 until 2016. Headquartered in East Providence, Rhode Island, the chain grew to a peak of more than 30 locations across eleven states and primarily served American cuisine. The restaurants were styled after a Pacific lodge aesthetic and featured animatronic animal characters based on North American wildlife. After rapid growth in the 1990s, Bugaboo Creek filed for bankruptcy in 2010, which led to widespread closures during the early 2010s. The final location closed in 2016.

== History ==
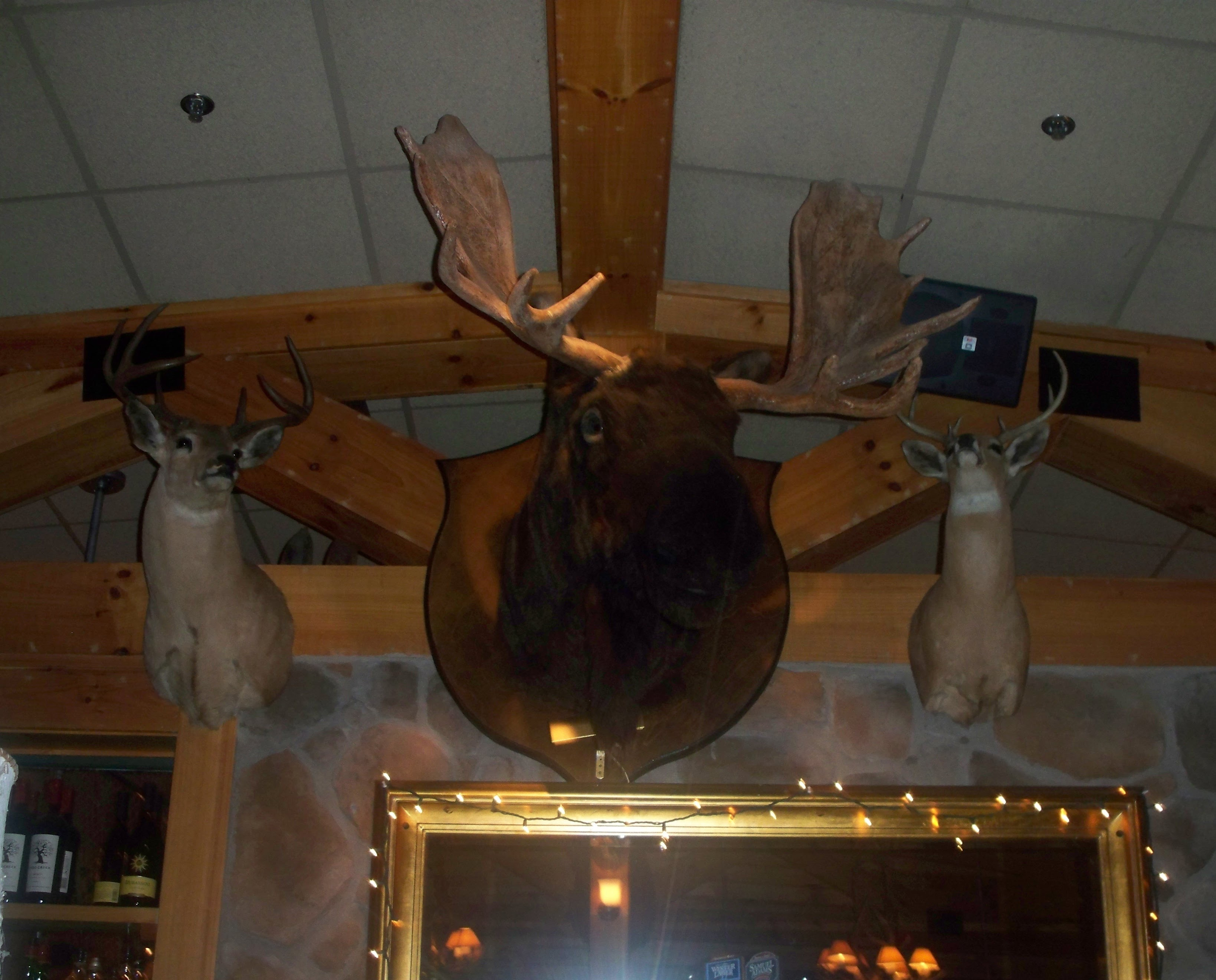
An animatronic moose wall mount was one of several audio-animatronics found at Bugaboo Creek Steakhouse locations

Bugaboo Creek Steakhouse was established by Edward P. Grace III, a restaurateur who had previously founded Hemenway’s Seafood Grill in 1985 and The Capital Grille chain in 1990, both in Providence, Rhode Island. Drawing on the early success of The Capital Grille, Grace developed Bugaboo Creek as a more casual, family-oriented concept influenced by the growth of casual dining steakhouses such as Outback Steakhouse and LongHorn Steakhouse, as well as the broader trend of themed restaurants in the United States during the early 1990s, including Rainforest Cafe and Planet Hollywood.

The first Bugaboo Creek Steakhouse opened in Warwick, Rhode Island, in October 1992 under Grace’s company, Rare Hospitality International. The restaurant name is in reference to the Bugaboo Mountains, a subrange of the Purcell Mountains in British Columbia, Canada. The restaurants adopted an exaggerated Canadian wilderness lodge theme. Interiors incorporated rustic elements such as taxidermy, antiques, and stone fireplaces, alongside animatronic figures of North American wildlife that ranged from simple moving mounts to more complex audio-animatronics. Despite the theming, the menu was oriented toward American casual dining staples, including steaks, chicken, burgers, and appetizers typical of other chain steakhouses of the time.

The chain expanded with a second location in Seekonk, Massachusetts, in August 1993, and moved outside New England the following year with a location in Springfield, Virginia. In 1994, Rare Hospitality International became a publicly traded company under the ticker symbol “RARE.” The company merged with the LongHorn Steakhouse chain in 1996, making it its largest operating brand in Rare's portfolio. By the early 2000s, Bugaboo Creek had grown to 31 locations across eleven states, including Connecticut, Delaware, Georgia, Maine, Maryland, Massachusetts, New Hampshire, New York, Pennsylvania, Rhode Island, and Virginia.

=== Decline and closure ===
In August 2007, Darden Restaurants acquired Rare Hospitality International for about $1.4 billion. That deal included The Capital Grille, Bugaboo Creek, and LongHorn Steakhouse. After the Darden acquisition, Darden chose to keep LongHorn and The Capital Grille as part of its portfolio but divested Bugaboo Creek to private equity firm Trimaran Capital Partners (via CB Holding Corp), which also operated other casual dining concepts such as Charlie Brown’s Steakhouse. By the late 2000s, Bugaboo Creek was already experiencing declining traffic and sales, partially attributed to the overall decline of themed dining in the United States. In November 2010, CB Holding filed for Chapter 11 bankruptcy protection. At the time of the announcement, the company had 12 restaurants still in operation after closing 18 restaurants the previous week.

In July 2011, Bugaboo Creek was acquired out of bankruptcy by Capitol BC Restaurants LLC in a deal valued at approximately $10 million. The new ownership sought to stabilize the brand, updating menus and beginning to phase out many of the animatronic animal features that had originally distinguished the chain. In 2012, Capitol BC enlisted founder Ned Grace as an advisor to help reposition the concept. The rebranded concept, known as "BC Steakhouse," was introduced at only one former Bugaboo Creek location in Gaithersburg, Maryland, and was closed by 2015. Throughout the early 2010s, Bugaboo Creek locations continued to close gradually, often without advance notice to customers or employees. On June 27, 2016, the last Bugaboo Creek Steakhouse located in South Portland, Maine, was shuttered, marking the end of the chain.

== Animatronics ==
From the time of the chain's opening until the bankruptcy, Bugaboo Creek was known for its novelty animatronics. Among the real mounts of bucks, deer and bears, several recreated mounts would be fitted with robotics to talk and move. Depending on the location, moose or buffalo mounts would be near the dining tables or at the bar, whereas a constant Bill the Buffalo would watch over the customers coming into the dining room. The characters would break the fourth wall, sardonically referencing their status as perpetually trapped robots, hanging above the guests, who were happily enjoying their meals. Local restaurants would name these animatronics, such as Moxie the Moose or Goose the Moose. Classic flapping fish were included alongside raccoons or weasels who would pop out of wooden barrels. After the restaurant closed, the non-robotic mounts were sold at local auctions, yet the locations of the talking moose and buffaloes are unknown, the auctioneer responsible for the bankruptcy auction believed them to have found homes in other game themed restaurants.
