= Richard Nesbitt =

Canadian financial executive

Richard William Nesbitt
- Born: October 7, 1955 (age 70); Toronto, Canada
- Occupation: Business executive
- Known for: CEO of TSX Group until 2008
- Spouse: Susan Nesbitt
- Children: 2

Richard William Nesbitt is a Canadian financial executive who currently manages KalNes Capital Partners' partner. Previously, he was the president and CEO of Global Risk Institute and CEO of Toronto Stock Exchange.

In addition, in cooperation with the London School of Economics, he led the creation of a new research institute, The Inclusion Initiative At LSE, which was mandated to improve diversity and inclusion in the finance industry. He was also an adjunct professor at the Rotman School of Management of the University of Toronto where he taught a course entitled "How Banks Work: Management in a New Regulatory Age." Richard is also chair of the advisory board of the Mind-Brain Behaviour Hive at the same university.

== Career ==
Richard served as president and chief operating officer of BayStreetDirect Inc., an Internet-based investment dealer. Before that, he was president and chief executive officer of HSBC Securities Canada for three years, after working for ten years at CIBC Wood Gundy. He has also worked with Mobil Oil Canada Ltd. for five years and spent two years as a lecturer at the University of Western Ontario, Richard Ivey School of Business.

Richard was the chief operating officer of Canadian Imperial Bank of Commerce until he retired from the role in September 2014.

Nesbitt was a governor (member of the board of directors) of the Toronto Stock Exchange from 1996 until December 1999.

Until his resignation in January 2008, he was the CEO of TSX Group, which operates the Toronto Stock Exchange and the TSX Venture Exchange. He is on the board of directors of TSX Group, the World Federation of Exchanges, Market Regulation Services, CanDeal, Frontier College and the Prostate Cancer Research Foundation of Canada.

In 2008, in partnership with Thomas Kalafatis, Richard was the co-founder of KalNes Capital Partners, a private family office that made various software, technology, and financial investments. He became CEO of CIBC World Markets on February 29, 2008.

== Awards ==
In 2019, Richard was awarded the Lifetime Achievement Award from the Rotman School of Management. He was recognized in 2014 with the Visionary Award by the organization Women in Capital Markets for work during his career on the issue of sponsoring gender-diverse management teams and boards to produce better companies. He also received Queen Elizabeth II, Diamond Jubilee Medal for community service, and the Arbor Award from the University of Toronto for his work with the school.
