= Russell Harrison =

Russell Harrison may refer to:

- Russell Harrison (broadcaster), New Zealand television presenter
- Russell Benjamin Harrison (1854–1936), American businessman, lawyer, diplomat, and politician
- Russell E. Harrison (1921–2014), Canadian banker
- Rusty Harrison (born 1981), Australian speedway rider
