= ACGL =

ACGL may refer to:

- Arch Capital Group, a Bermuda public company
- AFC Challenge League, a football competition
