= John S. Hunkin =

Canadian banker (1945–2025)

- Born: 14 April 1945; Toronto, Ontario, Canada
- Died: 6 January 2025 (aged 79); Chester, Nova Scotia, Canada
- Education: University of Manitoba (BA); York University (MBA)
- Spouse(s): Barbara Becker (m. 1969, divorced) Susan Crocker (m. 1994)

John Stewart Hunkin (14 April 1945 – 6 January 2025) was a Canadian banker who served from 1999 to 2003 as chairman, and from 2003 to 2004 as president of the Canadian Imperial Bank of Commerce. Hunkin joined the bank in 1969 and obtained his first managerial post in 1979. He worked in the bank's American operations through the 1980s, was appointed a senior vice-president in 1984, and executive vice-president in 1986. Following the bank's acquisition of Wood Gundy in 1988, Hunkin became president of the brokerage, and in 1990 its chief executive. In 1992, following the appointment of Al Flood as chairman and chief executive of the bank, Hunkin became, along with Holger Kluge, one of the bank's two divisional presidents.

On 3 June 1999, Hunkin beat out Kluge to succeed Flood as chairman and chief executive. He remained in the post until 7 August 2003, when the bank elected a separate, non-executive chairman. Hunkin served subsequently as president and chief executive officer. He ceded the presidency on 2 December 2004, and the title of chief executive on 1 August 2005, both of which were assumed by Gerald Thomas McCaughey.

== Biography ==
=== Early life and education ===
John Stewart Hunkin was born in Toronto on 14 April 1945, to Peter Hunkin (1909–1980) and Ethel Annie Vallar (1908–2003). Peter was born in St Austell, Cornwall, while Ethel was born in Paisley, Renfrewshire, and the couple married in Toronto in 1937. The Hunkins had four children: Barbara, Peter, John, and Susan. John's father had begun his career with the Canadian Bank of Commerce in 1927. In 1950 he was appointed assistant manager of the bank's main branch in Ottawa, then transferred to the head office in Toronto in 1953 where he was appointed an inspector. In 1955 he became assistant manager of the personnel department, then chief inspector, and in 1957 was appointed assistant general manager of personnel. After the 1961 merger of the Canadian Bank of Commerce and the Imperial Bank of Canada, Hunkin retained his position of assistant general manager of personnel with the new Canadian Imperial Bank of Commerce. In 1964 he became regional general manager of Manitoba.

John Hunkin graduated from Michael Power High School in Toronto in 1963. That fall, he began university at St. Francis Xavier University in Antigonish, Nova Scotia. Later he transferred to the University of Manitoba, where he graduated with a Bachelor of Arts in economics in 1967. In the fall of that year he returned to Toronto and enrolled at York University, where he earned a Master of Business Administration in 1969.

=== Career ===
Hunkin began his career with the CIBC in 1969. In 1979 he was appointed general manager for international money market operations, and in 1980 became general manager for the bank's American operations. In 1984 he became senior vice-president of the bank's American unit, and in 1986 was appointed executive vice-president of The Americas, Investment Bank.

In the summer of 1987, the Ontario government changed its securities regulations to allow banks to acquire majority stakes in investment brokerages. Consequently, in January 1988 the CIBC acquired a 65 per cent stake in the brokerage house Wood Gundy for $190 million. Following the acquisition, in June of that year, Hunkin was appointed president and chief operating office of Wood Gundy. He remained in this role until July 1990, when he was appointed deputy chairman and chief executive officer of Wood Gundy. Hunkin succeeded G. Edmund King as chief executive, and was replaced as president and chief operating officer by Richard Venn.

When Al Flood succeeded R. Donald Fullerton as the bank's chairman in June 1992, the four operating units were reduced to two. The bank's corporate and investment banking arms were merged into a new unit called CIBC World Markets. At this time, Hunkin left his post with Wood Gundy to become president of the new unit. Holger Kluge remained president of the personal banking unit, while the administrative banking unit was phased out. As presidents of the two operating units, Kluge and Hunkin served as joint chief operating officers of the bank.

In the spring of 1998, chairman Flood negotiated a proposed merger with the Toronto-Dominion Bank. However, December of that year, the merger was blocked by federal finance minister Paul Martin. Following the failure of the merger, Flood announced his retirement in January 1999. The announcement set of a race between Kluge and Hunkin for the post of chairman and chief executive. Prior to the decision, the two men came to an agreement that the loser would leave the bank. On 1 April 1999, the board announced the election of Hunkin as chairman.

Hunkin remained chairman and chief executive until 2003. That year, the bank decided to elected a separate, non-executive chairman and grant chief executive authority to a president. Consequently, on 7 August 2003, William Albert Etherington was elected chairman, while Hunkin became president and chief executive officer. On 2 December 2004, Gerald Thomas McCaughey succeeded Hunkin as president. In June 2005, Hunkin announced that he would retire as chief executive on 1 August and that McCaughey would succeed him.

=== Personal life ===
On 27 September 1969, Hunkin married Barbara Anne Becker at Trinity United Church in Grimsby. After his divorce, he married Susan Crocker. In his retirement, Hunkin and his wife Susan moved to Chester, Nova Scotia, where they were active in philanthropy in support of medical research and other charitable causes. In 2019, Hunkin was awarded the Order of Canada "for his active governance and philanthropic commitment to education, health and mental health."

Hunkin died in Chester, Nova Scotia from a suspected heart attack on 6 January 2025, at the age of 79.
