= PebblePost =

American marking technology company

- Industry: Marketing Technology
- Founded: October 1, 2014
- Founders: Lewis Gersh; Tom Gibbons; Robert Victor
- Headquarters: New York, NY
- Services: marketing and mailing services

PebblePost is a New York-based marketing technology company founded by Lewis Gersh, Tom Gibbons and Robert Victor in 2014. The company invented a marketing channel called Programmatic Direct Mail, which takes online web browsing intent data to send relevant direct mail. PebblePost was selected for The ARF's First Innovators A-List and named in the 2016 list of the 100 Most Exciting Startups.

== History ==
The company was founded by Lewis Gersh, Tom Gibbons and Robert Victor in 2014 and is headquartered in New York. Gersh has stated that at first the company had trouble finding support and was "mostly kicked to the curb with it" but the founders persisted, raising a successful seed round followed by the release of their Programmatic Direct Mail technology platform.

In 2018 PebblePost gathered support and funds from Advance Venture Partners, Capital One Growth Ventures and other investors to close out the company's Series C round, which totaled $31 million. PebblePost has also received funding from RRE, Greycroft, Tribeca Venture Partners, and other investors in digital media.

The company has filed for a number of various utility patents on the manufacturing of privacy complaint, targeted direct mail, which are pending for their digital-to-direct mail technology. In addition, PebblePost was granted the trademark for “Programmatic Direct Mail” on March 22, 2016. PebblePost currently has approximately 51-200 employees and is headquartered in the NoHo neighborhood of New York City.

== Functions ==
PebblePost is a digital-to-direct mail marketing platform that provides brands with a medium to reach shoppers at home with highly targeted mail. PebblePost operates by using clickstream data from brand's website visitors to help brands determine which customers are most likely to be interested in certain products at a given time, and then sends branded mail to them within 12–24 hours every day.

== Reception ==
PebblePost received positive reception with the release of the Programmatic Direct Mail platform, signing over 100 brand partners as well as a listing in ARF's First Innovators A-List. PebblePost was also included in another list of "Most Exciting Startups in New York" by the Berlin-based business magazine The Hundert, which included Business Insider's Henry Blodget and Karl-Theodor zu Guttenberg, chairman of Spitzer Partners as judges.

Programmatic Direct Mail has been recognized by the United States Postal Service as part of "the next generation of direct mail". Business Wire praised PebblePost as the first company to unite the power of digital advertising and the performance of physical mail. Forbes Magazine noted PebblePost's fast growth and expansion in its ventures. Kimberly Collins of the website ClickZ featured PebblePost in its "Martech Company of the Week", calling it "one technology that might be cutting through the noise."
