= Sonia Baxendale =

Canadian executive

Sonia Ameena Baxendale is a Canadian executive in the financial services industry. She received her undergraduate degree from the University of Toronto and has been recognized as one of the Top 100 Most Powerful Women in Canada. She has worked in senior positions for CIBC and Foresters and in 2019 she was named president and CEO of the Global Risk Institute.

== Biography ==
Baxendale obtained her undergraduate degree from the University of Toronto after attending Victoria College and went to work for American Express Canada and Saatchi & Saatchi before joining CIBC in 1992.

Baxendale held various leadership roles at CIBC including Senior Executive Vice-president, CIBC Wealth Management, Executive Vice-president, Asset Management, Card Products and Collections, and Executive Vice-president of Global Private Banking and Investment Management Services. Under her leadership of the Retail Market, CIBC became Canada's largest issuer of Visa and MasterCard.

In 2011, Baxendale retired from CIBC during a reorganization of the executive leadership team.

From July 2017 to January 2018, Baxendale served as Co-Interim President and CEO of Foresters Financial until Jim Boyle was hired as full time CEO. She remains a member of Forrester's Board of Directors - a role she has held since 2012. She also serves on the boards of Laurentian Bank and CI Financial and is a non-executive board member at RSA.

In December 2019 the Global Risk Institute announced that Baxendale would replace Richard Nesbitt as CEO effective January 7, 2020.

Baxendale now serves on a number of private and not-for-profit boards including the University of Toronto's Rotman School of Management Master of Financial Risk Management Advisory Board. In 2007 she joined the Board of Directors of SickKids Foundation and now serves as chair of the Board of SickKids Foundation and a member of the board of trustees for The Hospital for Sick Children.

Baxendale also served as a member of the board of directors for the Toronto Symphony Orchestra from 2012 to 2016. The TSO has undergone a number of leadership changes; Jeff Melanson resigned as president and chief executive officer (CEO) of the Toronto Symphony Orchestra (TSO) after only serving 18 months. The orchestra announced that Sonia Baxendale would assume the interim role for six months while a replacement for Melanson was found.

== Awards and honors ==
In 2000 Baxendale was recognized as one of the Top 40 Under 40 in Canada She was inducted to Canada's Most Powerful Women: Top 100™ Hall of Fame in 2010 after having won the annual award three years in a row.

She is a recipient of the University of Toronto, Victoria College Alumni of Distinction award in 2017.
