= Charlie Brown's Fresh Grill =

Restaurant chain based in New Jersey

Coordinates: 40.97725°N 74.07143°W

- Company type: Private
- Industry: Restaurants
- Genre: Casual dining
- Founded: 1966; 60 years ago
- Headquarters: Washington Township, Bergen County, New Jersey, U.S.
- Number of locations: 2
- Area served: New Jersey
- Products: American cuisine
- Owner: Praesidian Capital
- Website: www.charliebrowns.com

Charlie Brown's Fresh Grill (formerly known as Charlie Brown's Steakhouse and simply called Charlie Brown's) is a regional American casual dining restaurant chain based in Washington Township, New Jersey. The remaining locations are located in Scotch Plains, New Jersey and Woodbury, New Jersey.

== History ==
Charlie Brown's Steakhouse was founded in 1966 in Warren Township, New Jersey, by three businessmen. The first and flagship location was opened on Valley Road in Warren Township, next to Watchung. The signature dish was prime rib and the house salad topped with egg, shrimp and catalane dressing. A salad bar was an option vs. the house salad. The business became successful enough to open various Charlie Brown locations throughout New Jersey, as well as expanding to the bordering states of New York and Pennsylvania. The restaurant was originally owned by CB Holding Corp. In 1997, Charlie Brown's was sold to Castle Harlan, and then acquired in 2005 by Trimaran Capital Partners. As of April 2011, Charlie Brown's Steakhouse is currently owned by Praesidian Capital, a private equity company.

Original logo

2001-2013 logo

== Menu ==
Charlie Brown's offers steak, seafood, sandwiches, salads, chicken, BBQ ribs, pasta, burgers and raisin bread. There is also a salad bar.

== Bankruptcy ==
The restaurant's parent company filed for bankruptcy in November 2010, as part of a restructuring that included the closing of 47 restaurants, including 29 Charlie Brown's locations. In 2011, a New York private-equity company agreed to pay $9.5 million to buy Charlie Brown's Steakhouse. CB Restaurants Inc. took over 20 Charlie Brown's restaurants, including 17 locations in New Jersey and The Office Beer Bar & Grill chain was sold to Villa Restaurant Group for $4.7 million. Nearly 20 locations closed as a result of the COVID-19 pandemic and one of its final restaurants is located in Scotch Plains, New Jersey. The Woodbury location reopened on April 18, 2022.
