= Stephen Robert =

American financial business executive

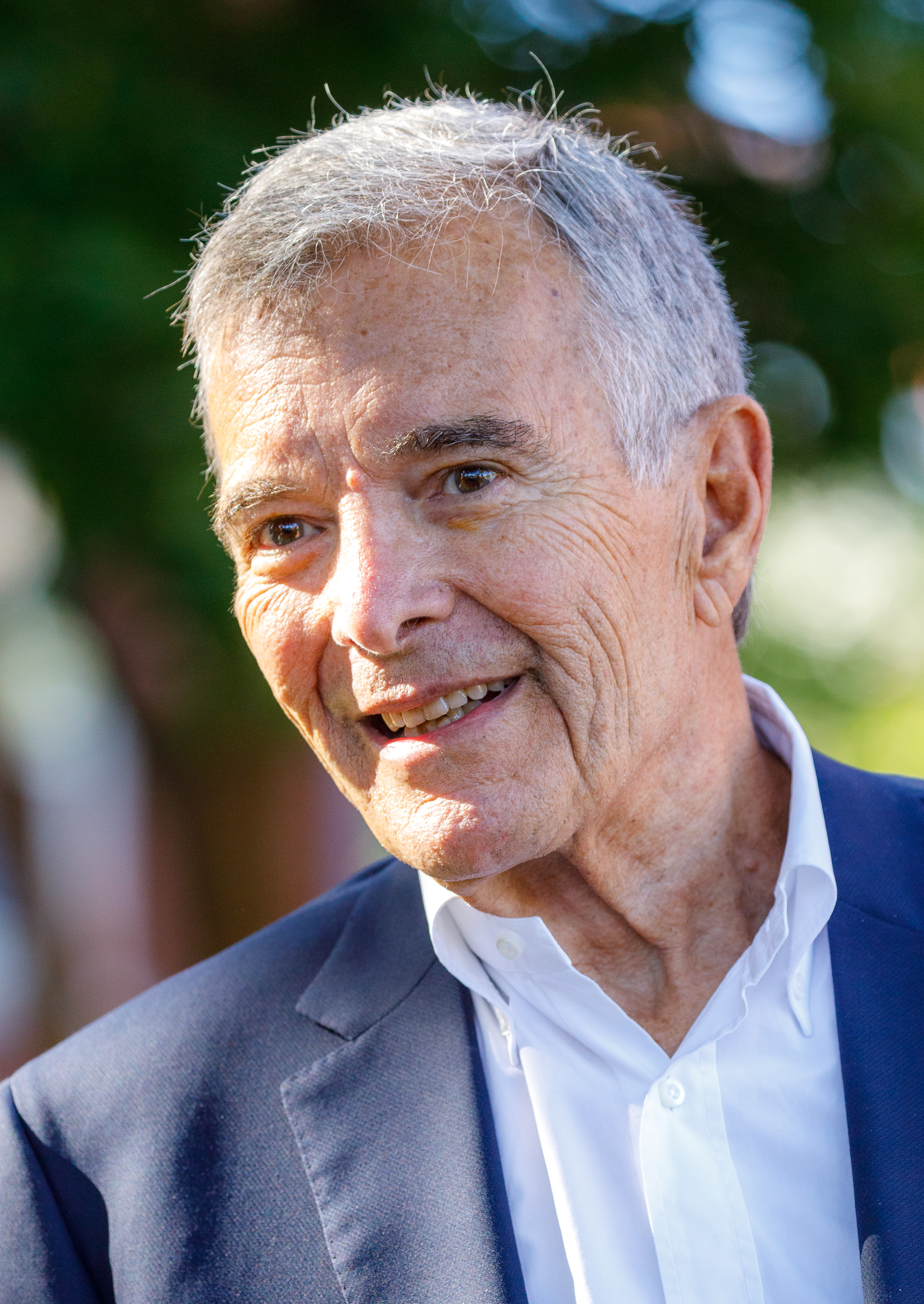
- Robert in 2024

19th Chancellor of Brown University
- In office 1998–2007
- Preceded by: Artemis A. W. Joukowsky
- Succeeded by: Thomas J. Tisch

Personal details
- Born: June 13, 1940 (age 86) Haverhill, Massachusetts, U.S.
- Spouse(s): Eileen Robert (divorced); Pilar Crespi (present)
- Education: Phillips Exeter Academy; Brown University; London School of Economics; Columbia Business School
- Occupation: Financial business executive, academic administrator, philanthropist

Stephen Robert (born June 13, 1940) is an American financial business executive, academic administrator, and philanthropist. He was Chairman and CEO of Oppenheimer & Co. from 1983 to 1997, and Chancellor of Brown University from 1998 to 2007. As a philanthropist, he heads the Source of Hope Foundation, which provides basic services to communities in great need around the world. As a journalist, he has published articles on Israeli–Palestinian relations and on the U.S. economy in major national and international publications.

== Early life and education ==
Robert was born in 1940 in Haverhill, Massachusetts. He has stated, "I grew up in a typically Jewish family in New England [...] My father was president of the local synagogue; my mother was president of the local Hadassah."

He attended Phillips Exeter Academy, where he graduated in 1958. He received a BA in political science from Brown University in 1962. He did post-graduate studies at the London School of Economics (1962–1963) and Columbia Business School (1963–1965).

In 2004, Brown University bestowed upon him an honorary Doctor of Humane Letters degree.

== Business career ==
Robert began his career in 1965 on Wall Street, as a securities analyst at the investment firm of Faulkner, Dawkins & Sullivan.

In 1968, he began working at the investment bank Oppenheimer & Co. as a portfolio manager, later becoming chief investment officer. He became head of research in 1976. In 1979, he was appointed President, and was positioned for the role of Chairman and CEO, since the company's longterm head, Jack Nash, wished to eventually retire. In 1982, during Robert's presidency, Oppenheimer was acquired by Mercantile House Holdings in London, and Robert joined the Mercantile House board of directors.

He became Oppenheimer's Chairman and CEO in 1983. In 1986, Robert and Nathan Gantcher, Oppenheimer's president, led a management group that purchased an 82% interest in the company from its parent Mercantile House Holdings. The buyout returned Oppenheimer to private ownership, and Robert became the company's principal owner. In 1997, he and Gantcher sold Oppenheimer to the Canadian Imperial Bank of Commerce (CIBC), and Robert resigned from the firm.

From 2005 to 2009, he was Chairman and CEO of Renaissance Institutional Management, an investment firm that advises high net-worth and institutional investment clients, which is a subsidiary of Renaissance Technologies. He retired in 2009 to focus on philanthropic work.

Robert is Chairman and CEO of his own investment firm, Robert Capital Management, based in Manhattan.

== Brown University ==
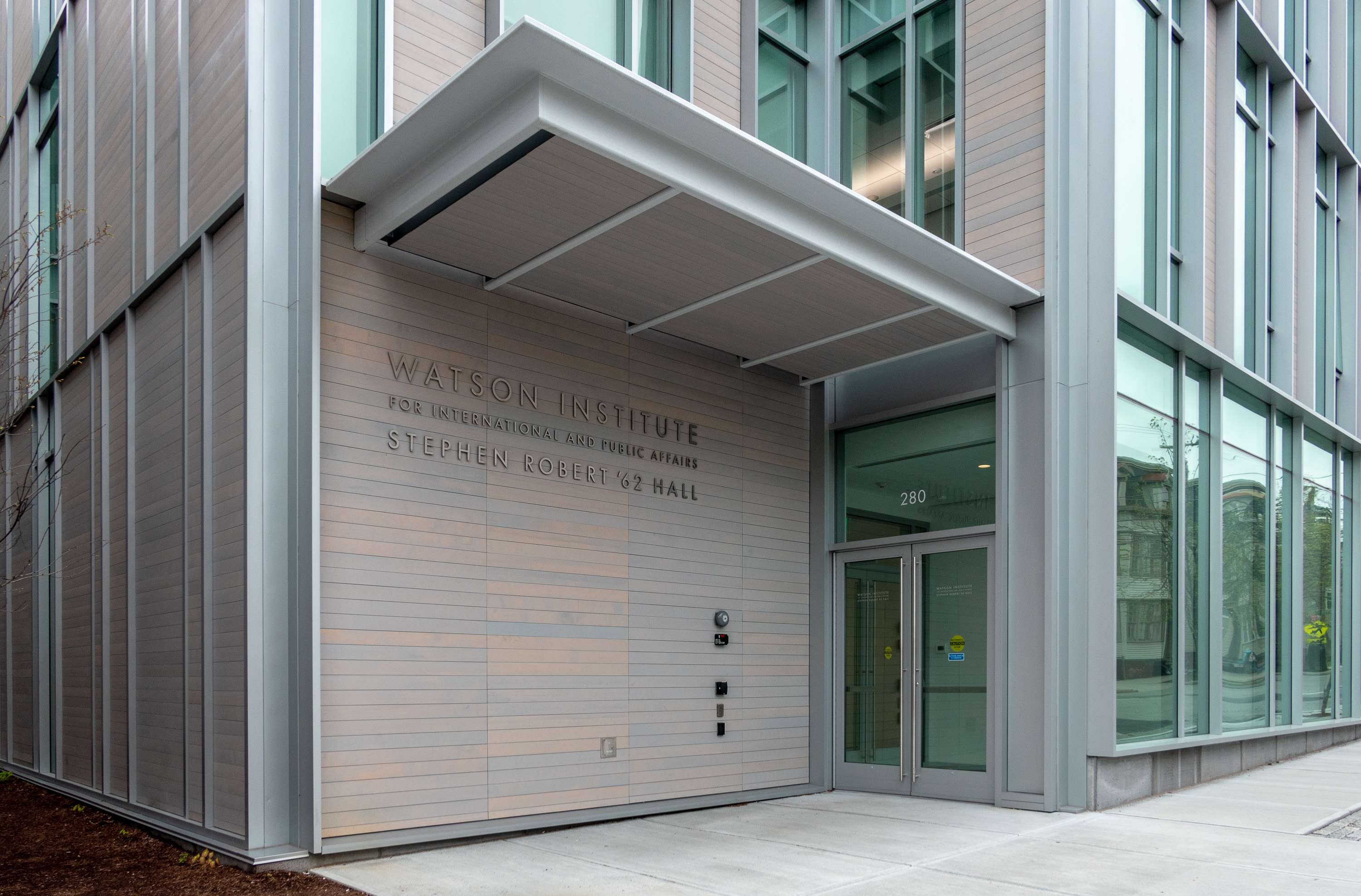
Stephen Robert Hall at Brown University

Robert was Chancellor of Brown University from 1998 to 2007, having previously been on the university's board of trustees from 1984 to 1994 and on its board of fellows since 1994. He had also been on numerous committees at the university, including the committee on investment, which he chaired from 1986 to 1997.

As Chancellor, he co-launched the Stephen Robert Initiative for the Study of Values, a multi-pronged and ongoing campus initiative to study moral and ethical values and integrate the study of human values into the college curriculum. He also guided the university through the sudden resignation of its president, E. Gordon Gee, and chaired the 2000 presidential selection committee that named Ruth J. Simmons as Gee's successor. In 2004 he donated $500,000 to create and endow the Chancellor Stephen Robert Fellowship, a fellowship for graduate students in any discipline.

In 2007, the Brown faculty bestowed on him its highest honor, the Susan Colver Rosenberger Medal, for "specially notable or beneficial achievement". The chair of the faculty executive committee stated, "The Brown faculty is proud to honor the leadership of Stephen Robert. His stewardship has led this university through the many extraordinary accomplishments in pursuit of the Plan for Academic Enrichment, including its emphasis on recruiting the best minds, and recruiting the best scholars."

In 2007, he also provided the lead gift, along with three anonymous donors, for a $20-million renovation of Faunce House, a historic building on campus, in order to create a space for the entire Brown community to gather. In the fall of 2010, the newly renovated building was renamed the Stephen Robert Campus Center, in honor of his leadership and achievements. Robert's intention for the extensive renovation was to foster greater interaction among Brown's students, faculty, and staff, and to achieve academic enrichment by building a shared sense of community.

Robert is also chairman of the Watson Institute for International and Public Affairs at Brown. In 2015, he was one of a consortium of three donors who jointly donated $50 million to the institute to fund construction of a new building, expansion of the institute's faculty, and expansion and creation of initiatives aimed at addressing some of the world's most difficult policy challenges. In May 2019, Brown University named the new building the Stephen Robert Hall in his honor.

== Politics, philanthropy, and journalism ==
Robert is a member of the Council on Foreign Relations, a member of the Foreign Policy Program Leadership Committee at the Brookings Institution, and a member of the Investment Committee of the Peter G. Peterson Foundation. He is a Trustee and Treasurer of the Solomon R. Guggenheim Foundation, and a trustee of and substantial donor to New York-Presbyterian Hospital. He has formerly been on the boards of directors of Xerox, The Manhattan Institute, the New York Philharmonic, and WNET/THIRTEEN. He was formerly a member of the advisory board of Blackstone Alternative Asset Management, and formerly on the President's Advisory Council at Teachers College, Columbia University.

Robert and his wife Pilar Crespi Robert are the founders of the Source of Hope Foundation, which provides assistance to communities lacking resources such as health care, education, water, food, and micro-financing opportunities. In partnership with non-governmental organizations, the foundation has conducted humanitarian relief, including relief for those affected by natural disasters, in areas such as sub-Saharan Africa, Israel, Palestine, Haiti, Colombia, and New York City. The Roberts are co-Chairs of the foundation; they are actively involved in its projects, and travel frequently to follow up. The Roberts are also heavily involved in, and have made large donations to, the Henry Street Settlement, a nonprofit social service agency which serves persons in need in Manhattan's Lower East Side. Robert was previously a director of Millennium Promise, a foundation dedicated to meeting the basic needs of the world's poorest people.

As a journalist, Robert has written articles for a variety of national and international publications. In the wake of the recession, he has published analysis and advice regarding the U.S. economy in Forbes and The Daily Beast.

In the 2010s, he has published several articles critical of Israel's policies on Palestine, in venues including The Nation, Haaretz, and the New York Times. He has also spoken at the Watson Institute for International and Public Affairs at Brown University, with the same critiques. From his standpoint as a Jew, a supporter of Israel, a benefactor and director of the Museum of Jewish Heritage, a director of the U.S./Middle East Project (USMEP), and a governor of the American Jewish Committee, he has maintained that Israel is an apartheid state. Citing the UN's specific definition of apartheid – a system where "one institutionalized racial group deprives another racial group of their rights" – he has pointed out, among other deprivations, Palestinians' inability to receive secondary and tertiary medical care; their lack of freedom of movement; restrictions on trade, water, and farming; and the arbitrary arrest they are subject to. He believes that Israel needs a Palestinian state in order to remain a democratic Jewish state. His 2018 opinion piece in Haaretz noted Israel's turn towards right-wing extremism and Donald Trump's complicity in that.

In May 2019, New York-Presbyterian Hospital launched the Pilar Crespi Robert and Stephen Robert Center for Community Health Navigation. The program "supports and empowers vulnerable families by helping them receive appropriate, continuous care and access services that address social barriers to care, such as food insecurity, domestic violence, immigration challenges, and substandard housing."

In October 2019, Stephen Robert and Pilar Crespi Robert received the Tzedek v’Shalom Award for their work with justice and peace at the 2019 J Street National Gala.

=== Potential ambassador nomination ===
In February 2022, it was reported that President Joe Biden would nominate Robert as the United States Ambassador to Italy. No formal announcement was made until 2023 when Biden selected Jack Markell instead.

== Personal life ==
Robert lives in Miami, Florida with his wife, Pilar Crespi Robert. He has two children from his former marriage to Eileen Robert.
