= CanDeal =

Canadian online financial exchange

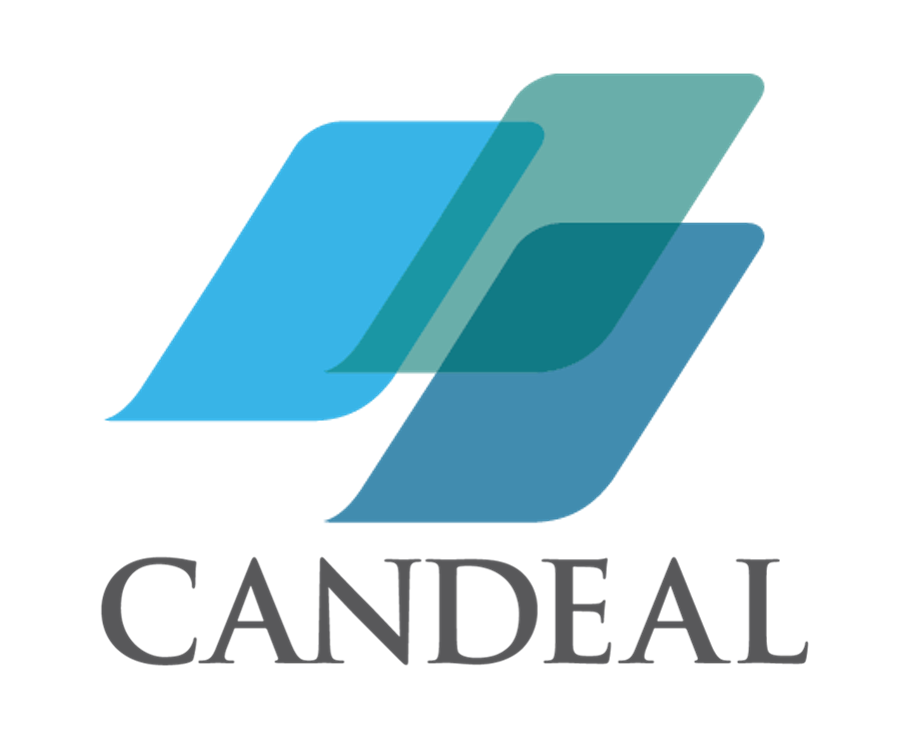
- Company type: Private
- Industry: Financial
- Founded: June 27, 2001
- Headquarters: Toronto, Ontario, Montreal, Quebec, Canada
- Key people: Jayson Horner (Co-Founder, President & CEO)
- Owner: Bank of Montreal; Bank of Nova Scotia; CIBC; National Bank of Canada; Royal Bank of Canada; TMX Group; Toronto-Dominion Bank
- Number of employees: +100
- Website: www.candeal.ca

CanDeal is a Canadian online exchange for Canadian dollar debt securities. It provides institutional investors access to liquidity for Canadian Government Bonds and money market instruments. CanDeal has offices in Toronto and Montreal and is owned by Canada's Six Major Banks and TMX Group (equally as of 2018 compared to a previous ownership structure in which TMX owned 47%).

CanDeal became a member of the Investment Dealers Association of Canada, and was granted alternative trading system status by the Ontario Securities Commission on July 2, 2002.

== History ==
- June 27, 2001 – CanDeal is created by founding shareholders BMO Nesbitt Burns, Basis100 inc., CIBC World Markets Inc., MoneyLine Network Inc., National Bank Financial Inc., RBC Dominion Securities Inc., Scotia Capital Inc. and TD Securities Inc.
- July 8, 2002 – TMX Group acquires a 40% stake in CanDeal.
- September 10, 2002 – CanDeal executes its first trade.
- January 1, 2003 - CanDeal's founder Jayson Horner leaves TD Securities to become full-time President and CEO of CanDeal.
- February 11, 2003 – CanDeal purchases Basis100's equity interest along with the rights to BasisXchange in Canada.
- September 9, 2003 – CanDeal adds Provincial Bond issues to its marketplace.
- August 18, 2004 – Aggregate volume traded on CanDeal surpasses $100 billion.
- October 19, 2004 – CanDeal announces its single day trading volume surpasses C$1 billion.
- December 1, 2004 – CanDeal trades $10 billion in a single month.
- November 1, 2005 – CanDeal launches a new division, Revolution Trading, an electronic inter-dealer trading network.
- March 24, 2006 - CanDeal acquires Moneyline's shares.
- October 11, 2006 – CanDeal surpasses One-half Trillion in aggregate volume traded.
- August 8, 2007 – CanDeal announces that it has surpassed One Trillion Dollars in aggregate volume traded since inception.
- June 1, 2009 – CanDeal introduces butterfly trading to its marketplace.
- February 24, 2010 – CanDeal launches mobile fixed income pricing application for institutional professionals.
- July 7, 2010 – CanDeal Traded Volume Surpass $3 Trillion
- April 13, 2011 – CanDeal Volumes Surpass $4 Trillion; New Record Month and Quarter Set.
- January 13, 2013 – CanDeal launches the first multi-dealer-to-client trading platform for Canadian dollar interest rate swaps.
- June 18, 2014 – CanDeal surpasses $10 Trillion in aggregate fixed income & derivatives volume traded.
- October 30, 2018 – CanDeal's ownership restructured such that each of the six largest Canadian banks and the TMX have an equal stake in CanDeal.
- February 12, 2019 – CanDeal and the ownership group create Canada's first comprehensive fixed-income and derivatives market data hub called CanDeal Data & Analytics (DNA).
- December 16, 2019 – CanDeal surpasses $25 Trillion in aggregate volume traded.
- March 9, 2021 – CanDeal Data & Analytics (DNA) acquires CIBC's fixed income data business.
