= Paul Kantor =

Paul Kantor may refer to:

- Paul Kantor (musician) (born 1955), American violin teacher
- Paul B. Kantor, American information scientist

== See also ==
- Paul Cantor (disambiguation)
- Paul Kantner (1941–2016), American rock musician
