= Constantine P. Iordanou =

Cypriot insurance executive (1950–2024)

Constantine P. 'Dinos' Iordanou (1950 – 16 June 2024) was a Cypriot insurance executive who was the chairman of the board and president and CEO of Arch Capital Group, an insurance, reinsurance, and mortgage insurance firm.

== History ==
Iordanou was the oldest of six children on the island of Cyprus. His father was a police officer. Iordanou immigrated to the United States in 1969. He graduated New York University with a BS in Aerospace Engineering.

After college, Iordanou worked for AIG. He was hired by Berkshire Hathaway in 1987 and worked as president of the company's commercial casualty insurance division. He worked at Zurich North America from 1992 to 2001, including as COO and CEO of Zurich American and CEO of Zurich North America. Iordanou was listed at #46 on The National Herald's list of Wealthiest Greek-Americans. He was named 2017 Insurance Leader of the Year by St. John's University's School of Risk Management.

== Arch Capital Group ==
Iordanou started Arch Capital Group with Paul Ingrey and Robert Clements in 2002, overseeing the firm's holding company. He was named CEO in 2002 and chairman of the board in 2009. He left Arch in 2019.

Iordanou was the director at Verisk Analytics, Inc., the Association of Bermuda Insurers and Reinsurers (ABIR), and the American Insurance Association (AIA). In 1975, he helped found the Pancyprian Association of America. Iordanou was a founding member of Faith: An Endowment for Orthodoxy and Hellenism.

== Vantage Risk ==
In 2020, Iordanou became Co-Founder and Non-Executive Chairman of Vantage Risk, a Bermuda-based reinsurance and insurance firm. By the time of his passing, Vantage had surpassed $1B USD in written premium.

== Death ==
Iordanou died on 16 June 2024, at the age of 74.

== Legacy ==
On October 28, 2025, Cristo Rey Brooklyn High School received a $210,000 gift from Vantage Risk private equity partners Carlyle and Hellman & Friedman along with Vantage executives in honor of Mr. Iordanou. The gift facilitates scholarships and work study programs with Vantage Risk. The donations "celebrate Mr. Iordanou's remarkable journey—from arriving in New York City from Cyprus at age 19 with just $250 to becoming a visionary leader in global re/insurance—and reflect his deep belief in the transformative power of education."
