= CIBC Wealth Management =

Division of the Canadian Imperial Bank of Commerce

CIBC Private Wealth
- Formerly: Wood Gundy, CIBC Wealth Management
- Type: Subsidiary
- Industry: Financial services
- Headquarters: Toronto, Canada
- Products: Wealth management
- Parent: Canadian Imperial Bank of Commerce (CIBC)
- Website: www.cibc.com/en/private-wealth.html

CIBC Private wealth is the brokerage division of the Canadian Imperial Bank of Commerce (CIBC).

CIBC prefers to use phrases like "wealth-building" and "wealth management" to describe its investment services. Like most banks, their financial products include stocks, bonds, mutual funds, managed portfolios, guaranteed investments, and credit. And like most retail businesses, they give free advice to their customers on what to buy.

== History ==
In 2003, the division was called CIBC Wealth Management and managed $193 billion in client assets and made $205 million of profit.

Until 2014, Wealth Management was headed by Gerald T. McCaughey, Chairman and Chief Executive Officer, CIBC World Markets and Vice Chair for Wealth Management. On July 31, 2014, CIBC announced the appointment of Victor Dodig as President and CEO which took effect on September 15, 2014.

This division was once called Wood Gundy and was once the biggest performing unit for CIBC.
