= Trimaran Capital Partners =

American middle-market private equity firm

- Industry: Private equity
- Predecessor: The Argosy Group
- Founded: 1990; 36 years ago
- Founder: Jay Bloom; Andrew Heyer; Dean Kehler
- Successor: Trian Acquisition Corp. Mistral Equity Partners
- Headquarters: 1325 Avenue of the Americas; New York, New York, U.S.
- Products: Leveraged buyouts, Growth capital, Venture capital
- AUM: USD 3.1 billion
- Parent: CIBC World Markets (prior)
- Divisions: Trimaran Fund Management, Trimaran Advisors
- Website: www.trimarancapital.com

Trimaran Capital Partners is a middle-market private equity firm formerly affiliated with CIBC World Markets. Trimaran is headquartered in New York City and founded by former investment bankers from Drexel Burnham Lambert. Trimaran's predecessors were early investors in telecom and Internet businesses, most notably backing Global Crossing in 1997. Trimaran also led the first leveraged buyout of an integrated electric utility.

Since 1995, Trimaran and its successor entities have invested approximately $1.6 billion of equity in fifty-nine companies through transactions totaling more than $10 billion in total value. In addition, Trimaran's debt business has managed approximately $1.5 billion of leveraged loans across four collateralized loan obligation vehicles.

Since 2006, one of its co-founders, Andrew Heyer, lead a spinout of a portion of its team to form Mistral Equity Partners In 2008, the two remaining managing partners entered into a venture with Nelson Peltz’s Trian to create a new debt-focused business development company.

The firm is named for the trimaran, a multi-hulled boat consisting of a main hull and two smaller outrigger hulls. The firm's principals had used nautical terms to describe their predecessor entities including argosy, a merchant ship, or a fleet of such ships and caravelle, a small, highly maneuverable, two- or three-masted ship.

== History ==
Trimaran Capital Partners was founded in 2000 by former Drexel Burnham Lambert and CIBC World Markets investment bankers Jay Bloom, Andrew Heyer, and Dean Kehler. The firm traces its roots back to the 1995 creation of the CIBC Argosy Merchant funds, a series of merchant banking investment funds managed on behalf of CIBC, and before that to the 1990 founding of the boutique investment banking firm The Argosy Group.

=== The Argosy Group ===
The Argosy Group was a New York-based boutique investment bank founded in February 1990, and is Trimaran's earliest predecessor. Founded as a 9-person advisory firm by Bloom, Heyer, and Kehler, Argosy was one of several private equities and investment banking firms to spring up in the wake of the collapse of Drexel Burnham Lambert. Before Drexel, the three bankers had all worked together at Shearson Lehman Brothers. Kehler and Bloom had worked together previously at Lehman Brothers Kuhn Loeb and were joined by Heyer when Lehman was acquired by Shearson/American Express. The Argosy team had been involved in many of the most prominent high yield financings of the preceding two decades, for companies including RJR Nabisco, Beatrice Foods, and Storer Communications.

The Argosy Group focused on debt underwriting, private placements, sales and trading, proprietary special situation investing, and restructuring advisory assignments for highly leveraged companies. Argosy created a niche raising high yield debt.

=== Acquisition by CIBC ===
In April 1995, CIBC's investment banking subsidiary, then known as CIBC Wood Gundy announced the acquisition of The Argosy Group,

In 1995, CIBC Wood Gundy, later CIBC World Markets, acquired the Argosy Group, the predecessor of Trimaran

The acquisition of Argosy marked an aggressive push by CIBC into the U.S. investment banking business. Prior to that point, CIBC had never done a junk bond deal. Argosy's three major principals had worked on some of the biggest junk bond deals of the 1980s while at Drexel Burnham Lambert. The 52 Argosy employees that CIBC acquired would constitute the core of what would become CIBC's High Yield Group and the CIBC Argosy Merchant Banking funds that were responsible for, among other things, the $2 billion windfall that CIBC would earn from its early investments in Global Crossing. The Argosy principals also managed two collateralized debt obligation vehicles known as Caravelle Funds I and II.

With the acquisition of Argosy in 1995 and Oppenheimer & Co. in 1997, the center of gravity of CIBC's investment banking operations began to shift toward the United States. CIBC's High Yield Group began to develop a reputation for financing complex leveraged buyout transactions and worked closely with several of the leading private equity firms. CIBC provided financing for many of the leading private equity firms of this period including: Apollo Management, Hicks Muse, Kohlberg Kravis Roberts & Co., Thomas H. Lee Partners, and Willis Stein & Partners.

Bloom, Heyer and Kehler took on increasing responsibilities within CIBC World Markets. Ultimately, as Vice Chairmen of the bank and co-heads of Leveraged Finance, the three Argosy founders had responsibilities for leveraged loan and high-yield sales, trading and research, debt private placements, restructuring advisory and financial sponsor coverage. They were also responsible for the creation and management of multiple special situations investment funds and collateralized debt obligation funds, and the creation of a major leveraged finance business in the U.K. In the aggregate, these businesses had several hundred employees in the United States, Canada and the U.K.

=== Investment in Global Crossing (1997–1999) ===
In 1997, the CIBC Argosy Merchant funds backed Gary Winnick and his telecom venture, Global Crossing, which embarked on a project to build optical fiber cable connections under the ocean between Europe and North America. Bloom, Heyer and Kehler, the heads of the CIBC Argosy Merchant funds and all former Drexel bankers, were former associates of Winnick from his days in the 1980s as a salesman at Drexel Burnham Lambert under Michael Milken. They were also instrumental in providing Global Crossing with $35 million in equity financing before the company went public. CIBC would ultimately realize a gain estimated to be $2 billion from its relatively small equity investment in Global Crossing, making it one of the most profitable investments by a financial institution in the 1990s. The investment is also thought to have personally generated millions of dollars for Bloom, Heyer and Kehler.

CIBC's investment in Global Crossing provided a considerable boost for its investment banking operations in the U.S. and for Bloom, Heyer and Kehler. In fact, CIBC's gain on its investment in Global Crossing would represent more than 20% of the bank's profits in 2000. Trimaran was founded in 2000, effectively on the back of the success of the Global Crossing investment. In April 2001, Trimaran closed on a $1 billion fund with capital provided primarily by CIBC.

=== Spinout from CIBC World Markets (2000–2002) ===
The investment banking operations of CIBC World Markets reached their peak in 1999 and 2000, when the bank cracked the top ten of U.S. issuers of high yield bonds and the top twenty in mergers and acquisitions advisory. From 1995 through 2000, the High Yield Group at CIBC World Markets had grown to more than 120 and had raised more than $80 billion of high yield debt. Following the crash of the dot-com bubble and the shutdown of the high yield markets in late 2000, CIBC World Markets began to suffer a series of setbacks. In July 2001, the Wall Street Journal profiled CIBC World Markets, chronicling the rapid decline of the bank from the peaks of Wall Street's league table rankings.

At the same time, the High Yield Group was restructured with the original Argosy Group founders focusing their responsibilities on their new Trimaran Capital Partners fund and the older CIBC Argosy Merchant funds. Bloom, Heyer and Kehler were succeeded by managing directors Edward Levy and Bruce Spohler, who had worked previously at Argosy and Drexel, together with Bill Phoenix.

By 2002, as a result of these developments, the CIBC implemented a strategy to reallocate resources and capital away from the riskier CIBC World Markets division in favor of its retail operations. As part of this reallocation, and in an effort to reduce conflicts between the bank's principal investments and its financial sponsor clients, the Trimaran operations would subsequently spinout completely from CIBC World Markets. Trimaran Capital Partners became independent of CIBC in February 2006

=== Investments (2002–2005) ===
Although Trimaran had made some investments in telecom and internet startups in 2000 and had also made investments in companies such as Iasis Healthcare and Village Voice Media, the bulk of its capital from its $1 billion 2001-vintage private equity fund was uninvested after its first year and a half.

From the end of 2002 through mid-2005, Trimaran actively pursued new investments. In December 2002, Trimaran partnered with Kohlberg Kravis Roberts & Co. to purchase the transmission business subsidiary, ITC Transmission, from DTE Energy. In 2003, Trimaran completed a number of leveraged buyouts including Reddy Ice (with Bear Stearns Merchant Banking), Norcraft (with Saunders Karp & Megrue)

Trimaran made a series of investments in 2004 including: jewellery retailer Fortunoff, specialty apparel retailer Urban Brands (Ashley Stewart clothing) and auto parts manufacturer Accuride Corporation. In 2005, Trimaran would add Charlie Brown Steakhouse, which would later acquire Bugaboo Creek Steak House in 2007. Trimaran would also make investments in Jefferson National and Broadview Networks among others.

== Successor entities ==
Trimaran initially attempted to raise a third, $1.25 billion fund in 2004, but existing limited partners expressed dissatisfaction with the fact that the firm had not fully invested its existing fund and had yet to produce sufficient realizations to merit a new commitment. Although Trimaran is still in operation managing its existing investment funds, the key professionals in the firm have embarked on a number of different ventures.

=== Mistral Equity Partners spinout (2007) ===
Following the failure of Trimaran to raise its third fund, in March 2007, Andrew Heyer, one of the three founders of Trimaran, left the firm to launch a new buyout firm. Mistral Equity Partners was founded with a team from Trimaran to make investments in the consumer and retail industries. Mistral successfully raised an approximately $300 million fund

Trimaran Capital Partners III has a preliminary target range of $700 million to $1 billion. Trimaran plans to raise an interim $300 million to make deals happen while beating the bushes for money for the larger fund. Fundraising for both is slated to start later this year, according to a source close to Trimaran. Without Heyer, Trimaran was never successfully raised.

Mistral formed a partnership with the Schottenstein family, which has acquired well-known retailers such as American Eagle Outfitters, DSW Shoe Warehouse and Filene's Basement. The family made an equity commitment to the new Mistral fund, and Jay Schottenstein assumed a part-time advisory role with the firm.

=== Joint Venture with Nelson Peltz / Trian Partners (2008) ===
Trimaran Partners, Jay Bloom and Dean Kehler, co-founders and managing partners of the private equity firm, have reportedly struck out on a venture with the Nelson Peltz-led hedge fund Trian Partners, investing in distressed corporate bonds, bank loans, and possible loan-to-own opportunities. The move, reuniting a former team from Drexel Burnham Lambert, does not signal an end to Trimaran, which will continue on as an independent entity. Bloom and Kehler had founded the PE firm in 1995. The jump back to corporate credit is not big leap for Bloom and Kehler. At Trimaran, the pair also oversaw Trimaran Advisors, which invests in below investment-grade corporate debt. David Millison, also a Drexel alum, had managed those funds for Trimaran as the chief investment officer. He is not expected to be joining Bloom and Kehler in the new venture. Bloom and Kehler have been paired off for much of their respective careers. Prior to Trimaran, both Bloom and Kehler had served as co-heads of the CIBC Argosy Merchant Banking Funds, the PE arm of CIBC World Markets.

== See also ==
- Canadian Imperial Bank of Commerce
- CIBC World Markets
- CIBC Wood Gundy
- Drexel Burnham Lambert
- Global Crossing
