= CIBC Wood Gundy =

Canadian financial services company

- Company type: Division
- Industry: Financial services
- Predecessor: Wood Gundy
- Founded: 1988; 38 years ago
- Headquarters: Toronto, Ontario, Canada
- Products: Brokerage
- Parent: CIBC World Markets Inc.
- Website: woodgundy.com

CIBC Wood Gundy is the Canadian full-service retail brokerage division of CIBC World Markets Inc., a subsidiary of the Canadian Imperial Bank of Commerce (CIBC). Through its network of over 1,000 investment advisors working in 80 locations across Canada, CIBC Wood Gundy offers an array of investment and insurance products and services.

CIBC Wood Gundy was created in 1988 with the purchase of Wood Gundy by CIBC. From 1988 through 1997, CIBC Wood Gundy was the universal name of CIBC's investment banking operations. However, after the acquisition by CIBC of the investment banking operations of U.S.-based Oppenheimer & Co. in 1997, the combined investment banking business was renamed CIBC Oppenheimer and later CIBC World Markets. Since 1997, the name CIBC Wood Gundy has been used as the brand for CIBC's retail brokerage business.

== History ==
Wood, Gundy & Company was established in Toronto, Ontario in 1905 by George Herbert Wood and James Henry Gundy. The firm first specialized in the distribution and underwriting of government and municipal bonds.

CIBC purchased a majority stake in Wood, Gundy & Co. in June 1988 for C$203 million. At the time of its acquisition, Wood Gundy was the leading Canadian investment dealer. Following the acquisition, CIBC formed CIBC Wood Gundy, which offered primarily asset management services for corporate and institutional clients. Two years later, in 1990, they continued to expand the Canadian securities business by acquiring much of Merrill Lynch & Company's Canadian business.

In 1997, CIBC Wood Gundy acquired the U.S. brokerage house Oppenheimer & Co. After the acquisition the U.S. division took the name CIBC Oppenheimer, eliminating the use of the Wood Gundy brand through much of the bank. The brand was retained for CIBC's retail brokerage operations.

In December 2001, CIBC acquired the Canadian retail brokerage business of Merrill Lynch, Merrill Lynch Canada, for an estimated $409 million. The acquisition of Merrill Lynch Canada, which it subsequently merged with its CIBC Wood Gundy business, greatly increased CIBC's own brokerage network, adding more than 1,000 brokers across Canada.

== See also ==
- Wood Gundy
- CIBC World Markets
- Canadian Imperial Bank of Commerce
