= CIBC Capital Markets =

Investment banking subsidiary of the Canadian Imperial Bank of Commerce

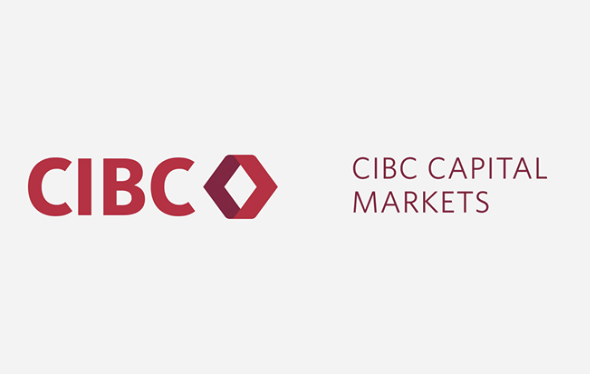
- Type: Subsidiary
- Industry: Investment banking
- Predecessors: Wood Gundy; The Argosy Group; Oppenheimer & Co.
- Founded: 1988; 38 years ago
- Headquarters: Toronto, Ontario, Canada
- Products: Investment Banking, Sales and trading, Capital markets
- Revenue: ▲ C$2.90 billion (2016)
- Net income: ▲ C$1.08 billion (2016)
- Total assets: ▲C$162.8 billion (2016)
- Number of employees: 1,100
- Parent: Canadian Imperial Bank of Commerce
- Website: cibccm.com

CIBC Capital Markets is the investment banking subsidiary of the Canadian Imperial Bank of Commerce. The firm operates as an investment bank both in Canadian and global equity and debt capital markets. The firm provides a variety of financial services including equity and debt capital market products, mergers and acquisitions, global markets (sales and trading), merchant banking, and other investment banking advisory services.

Established via a series of acquisitions, including Canadian brokerage Wood Gundy and U.S.-based Oppenheimer & Co., CIBC Capital Markets has been a leading investment bank in Canada with a notable presence in various international markets at times over the years.

CIBC Capital Markets is headquartered at Brookfield Place in Toronto with offices in Calgary, Montreal, Vancouver, Winnipeg, New York City, Chicago, Houston, Milwaukee, Bogotá, Beijing, Hong Kong, London, Luxembourg, Shanghai, Singapore, Sydney and Tokyo.

== History ==
=== CIBC Wood Gundy ===
CIBC Wood Gundy (1988–1997)

The original Wood Gundy company was established in Toronto in 1905 by George Herbert Wood and James Henry Gundy. CIBC purchased a majority stake in Wood Gundy in June 1988 for C$203.3 million. After the purchase, the CIBC formed CIBC Wood Gundy, which offered asset management services for corporate and institutional clients. Two years later, in 1990, they continued to expand the Canadian securities business by acquiring much of Merrill Lynch & Company's Canadian business. In 1997, Wood Gundy acquired Eyers Reed, an Australian broker firm for $20 million.

=== Acquisition of Argosy Group ===
In April 1995, CIBC Wood Gundy announced the acquisition of The Argosy Group, a New York-based investment banking firm involved primarily in the high-yield debt market. Argosy had been founded by three Drexel Burnham Lambert alumni: Jay Bloom, Andrew Heyer, and Dean Kehler, who had worked together in Drexel's New York office in the 1980s.

The acquisition of Argosy marked an aggressive push by CIBC into the US investment banking business. Prior to that point, CIBC had never done a junk bond deal. Argosy's three major principals had worked on some of the biggest junk-bond deals of the 1980s while at Drexel Burnham Lambert. The 52 Argosy employees constituted the core of what would become CIBC's High Yield Group and CIBC Argosy Merchant Banking funds that were responsible for, among other things, the $1 billion windfalls that CIBC would earn from its early investments in Global Crossing. The Argosy principals also managed two collateralized debt obligation vehicles known as Caravelle Funds I and II.

=== CIBC Oppenheimer ===
CIBC Oppenheimer (1997–1999)

In 1997, CIBC Wood Gundy, under the direction of Michael S. Rulle, acquired the American brokerage house Oppenheimer & Co. for $585 million. Subsequently, the merged companies were called CIBC Oppenheimer; Rulle remained the chairman and chief executive of the company while Stephen Robert and Nathan Gantcher of Oppenheimer became vice-chairmen of CIBC Oppenheimer. According to the deal, CIBC paid $350 million and additionally provided a $175 million that was paid in the course of over three years to help retain key executives from the firm.

=== Creating the CIBC Capital Markets platform ===
CIBC Capital Markets (1998–2002)

By 1999, CIBC Oppenheimer changed its name to CIBC Capital Markets and positioned itself as CIBC's international investment bank. The CIBC Capital Markets unit suffered a net loss of C$186 million during the fourth quarter of fiscal 1998 which dragged down the performance of the parent bank's stock by almost one-third. The loss in 1998 was due primarily to very rapid expansion into regions impacted by the various financial crises in 1998. As a result, CIBC Capital Markets refocused its efforts primarily on the U.S. and Canadian markets, despite the seemingly global ambitions implied in the unit's name.

CIBC Capital Markets reached a peak in 1999 and 2000, when the investment bank cracked the top ten of U.S. issuers of high yield bonds and the top twenty in mergers and acquisitions advisory. In 1999, CIBC Capital Markets backed Gary Winnick and his company Global Crossing to build optical fiber cable connections under the ocean. In 2000, CIBC realized a gain of $2.0 billion from its relatively small equity investment in Global Crossing, representing more than 20% of the bank's profits. On the back of the success in Global Crossing, CIBC backed the three heads of its CIBC Argosy Merchant Banking funds in a new private equity operation known as Trimaran Capital Partners. Trimaran closed on a $1 billion fund in April 2001, with capital provided primarily by CIBC.

In June 2001, CIBC announced the construction of a new $800 million office tower at 300 Madison Avenue (At the corner of Madison Avenue and 42nd Street). The 35-story, 1,200,000-square-foot (110,000 m^{2}) building was originally expected to house up to 3,000 employees, bringing CIBC's entire New York staff under one roof. When the 300 Madison building was completed in 2004, CIBC's diminished workforce took up only a few floors, leasing the remainder to PriceWaterhouseCoopers.

=== Challenges at CIBC Capital Markets ===
In July 2001, The Wall Street Journal profiled CIBC Capital Markets, chronicling the rapid decline of the bank from the peaks of Wall Street's league table rankings. By 2002, CIBC was forced to set aside C$1.5 billion for bad corporate loans, primarily from CIBC Capital Markets and the bank was linked two of the most famous victims of the corporate accounting scandals of the early 2000s: Enron Corporation and Global Crossing. As a result of these developments, the parent bank implemented a strategy to reallocate resources away from the riskier CIBC Capital Markets division in favor of its retail operations.

As part of this strategy, in 2003, CIBC sold an asset management division along with retail brokerage to Fahnestock Viner along with the Oppenheimer & Co. name. Also in September 2003, a jury found that CIBC had failed to provide complete financial information to investors in a high-yield bond offering. Just a few months later, at the end of 2003, CIBC reached an $80 million settlement with the Securities and Exchange Commission over its various financings for Enron, representing far more than the bank had earned in fees.

=== Sale to Oppenheimer & Co. (Fahnestock Viner) ===
In November 2007, Oppenheimer & Co. (Fahnestock) announced that it would purchase a major part of CIBC Capital Markets' U.S. Investment Banking, Corporate Syndicate, Institutional Sales and Trading, Equity Research, Options Trading and a portion of the Debt Capital Markets business which includes Convertible Bond Trading, Loan Syndication, High Yield Origination, and Trading as well as related operations located in the UK, Israel, and Hong Kong. The deal closed January 14, 2008, and essentially reunited the original Oppenheimer & Co. which CIBC divided into the sale to Fahnestock.

On February 29, 2008, CIBC Capital Markets Chairman and Chief Executive Officer Brian Shaw was replaced in both capacities by Richard Nesbitt, a former TSX Group CEO.

== Competition ==
CIBC Capital Markets faces competition from major global investment banks such as Goldman Sachs, Morgan Stanley and the RBC Capital Markets, equivalent branches of other financial conglomerates such as BMO Capital Markets, and TD Securities, and other independent/boutique investment banks and large cap advisory firms such as the corporate finance practices of Deloitte and KPMG.

== Notable current and former employees ==
- Geoff Belsher and Harry Culham, Co-Chair of CIBC Capital Markets
- Carson Block (born 1977), short-seller and investor
- Henry Blodget, equity research analyst
- Guy Adami, TV personality, author, financial analyst and professional investor
- Jeff Rubin, former chief economist, author of Why Your World Is About to Get a Whole Lot Smaller
- Meredith Whitney, equity research analyst

== See also ==
- Oppenheimer & Co.
- Wood Gundy Inc.
- CIBC Wood Gundy
