= Henry Blodget =

American businessman, investor and journalist

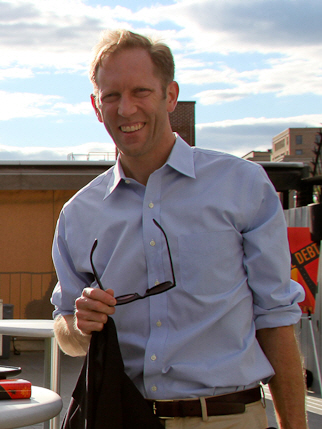
- Blodget in 2012
- Born: Henry Blodget; New York City, New York, U.S.
- Occupations: Businessman; Investor; Journalist
- Known for: Former securities analyst at Merrill Lynch during dot-com bubble charged with civil securities fraud

Henry Blodget is an American businessman, investor and journalist. He is notable for his former career as an equity research analyst who was senior Internet analyst for CIBC Oppenheimer and the head of the global Internet research team at Merrill Lynch during the dot-com era. Following the dot-com bubble, Blodget was charged with civil securities fraud by the United States Securities and Exchange Commission, settled the charges and was banned from working in the financial industry for life. Blodget is the co-founder and former CEO of Business Insider.

== Early life and education ==
Blodget was raised in Manhattan and attended Phillips Exeter Academy and Yale. After college, Blodget taught English in Japan, then moved to San Francisco to establish a writing career. He became a freelance journalist and a proofreader for Harper's Magazine.

== Investment career ==
In 1994, Blodget joined the corporate finance training program at Prudential Securities, and, two years later, moved to Oppenheimer & Co. in equity research. In October 1998, he predicted that the common stock of Amazon (Nasdaq: AMZN) then trading at $240, would be priced at $400 within a year. This was thought highly unlikely at the time; however, just three weeks later Amazon's stock price passed that mark, a gain of 67%. This call received significant media attention. Two months later, Blodget accepted a position at Merrill Lynch, and frequently appeared on CNBC and similar shows. He accepted a buyout offer from Merrill Lynch and left the firm in 2001. Subsequently, he was charged with civil securities fraud regarding actions taken while at Merrill Lynch.

== Fraud allegation and settlement ==
In 2002, then New York State Attorney General Eliot Spitzer published private Merrill Lynch e-mails in which Blodget negatively assessed stocks, in many cases conflicting widely with positive analysis he and Merrill Lynch had published. In 2003, he was charged with civil securities fraud by the U.S. Securities and Exchange Commission, relating to Blodget issuing materially misleading research reports on internet companies, and making exaggerated or unwarranted claims about them to customers. He settled the charges after making a payment of $4 million and was permanently barred from employment in the securities industry by the SEC, NASD, and NYSE.

== Writing ==
Following his ban from the financial industry, Blodget became a financial and economics writer. He has contributed to Slate, where his articles about investing carry a seven-paragraph disclosure of potential conflicts of interest.

In 2007, Blodget co-founded Business Insider (initially known as Silicon Alley Insider) and was its initial CEO and editor-in-chief. In January 2007, Blodget published The Wall Street Self-Defense Manual: A Consumer's Guide to Intelligent Investing. In November 2023, he stepped down as CEO.

== Published books ==
- The Wall Street Self-Defense Manual: A Consumer's Guide to Intelligent Investing. Atlas Books, 2007. ISBN 0-9777433-2-2.
