= Paul Cantor (Canadian lawyer) =

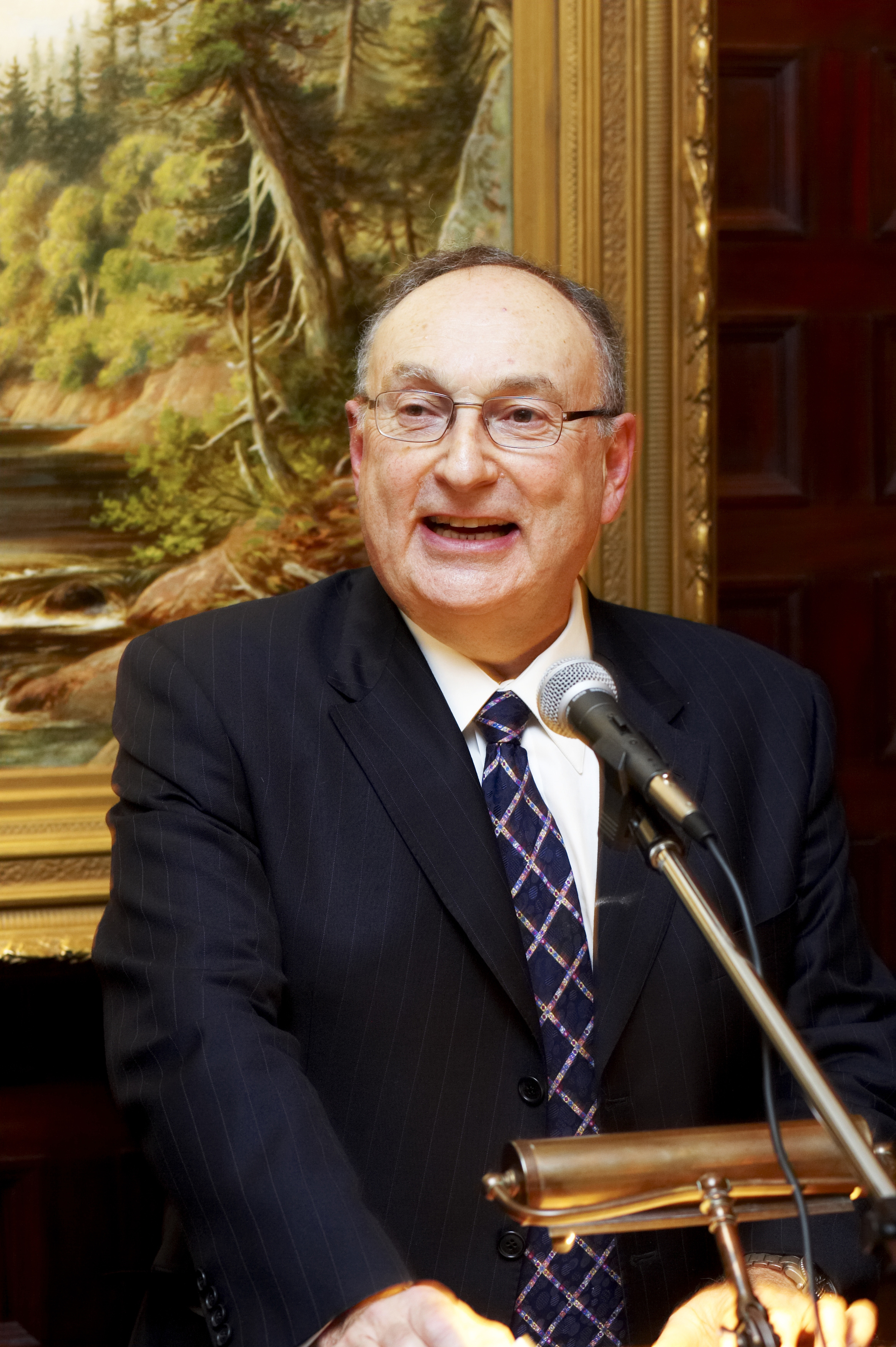
- Born: Edmonton, Alberta, Canada
- Occupations: Executive, corporate director, educator, lawyer
- Children: 2

Paul George Samuel Cantor, LLB, OC (8 January 1942 – 10 August 2018) was a Canadian lawyer, educator, and executive who worked in the private, public and non-profit sectors. He was a member of the Order of Canada, Canada's highest civilian honour.

== Early life ==
Cantor was born in Edmonton, Alberta. His father Max Cantor was a university professor and Chief Coroner of Alberta, while his mother Edith was a well known patron of the arts in Edmonton. Paul graduated from the University of Alberta with a Bachelor of Arts in 1972, then later relocated to Toronto where he earned a Bachelor of Law from the University of Toronto in 1968.

== Career ==
As a lawyer and executive, Cantor worked in various capacities most notably for Bennett Jones, Canadian Imperial Bank of Commerce, Russell Reynolds Associates and Confederation Life. Between 1976 and 1992 he led the founding and became President of the CIBC Investment Bank, consolidating internal groups and later acquiring and integrating Wood Gundy and the Canadian retail network of Merrill Lynch. He was the founding executive director of the Toronto International Leadership Centre, which focuses on strengthening the financial sector in the developing world.

Cantor also worked extensively in governance. He was chairman of the Canadian Public Sector Pension Investment Board between 2003 and 2012, leading them to become a world leader in investment management. He was chairman of the Board of Governors at York University between 2009 and 2012, then founding chairman of the board at the Global Risk Institute between 2012 and 2015. He also served as a board member for Torstar, the ING Bank of Canada (now Tangerine Bank) and Queen Elizabeth Hospital, Toronto.

== Awards ==
He was awarded the Order of Canada in September 2014 "for his contributions to the Canadian financial sector and for his support of post-secondary education."
