= Meredith Whitney =

American businesswoman (born 1969)

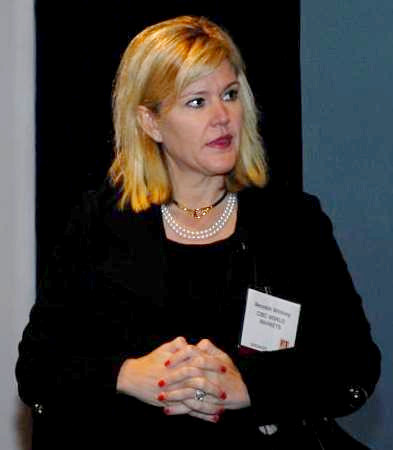
- Whitney in New York, 2007
- Born: Meredith Ann Whitney; November 20, 1969 (age 56); Summit, New Jersey, United States
- Education: Brown University
- Occupations: CEO and Founder
- Employer(s): Oppenheimer Holdings (1993–1998; 2004–2009); Wachovia (1998–2004); Arch Capital Group (2015–2019); Zume, Inc. (2019–2020); Kindbody (2021–2022); Meredith Whitney Advisory Group (2023-present)
- Spouse: John Layfield (m. 2005)
- Website: Official website

Meredith Ann Whitney (born November 20, 1969) is an American businesswoman and financial analyst. She is known for successfully forecasting the 2008 financial crisis, and was dubbed “The Oracle of Wall Street” by Bloomberg.

== Education and career ==
Whitney grew up in Bethesda, Maryland. She graduated from Madeira School in 1987, before attending a post-graduate year at Lawrenceville School, becoming a member of its first co-ed graduating class. She graduated with honors from Brown University in 1992 with a B.A. in history.

Whitney joined Oppenheimer Holdings in 1993 as a director, and in 1995 she joined the company's Specialty Finance Group. In 1998, she left Oppenheimer to become an executive director at Wachovia. Whitney returned to Oppenheimer in 2004, where she researched banks and brokers as a managing director. She resigned from Oppenheimer on February 19, 2009, to establish her own firm, Meredith Whitney Advisory Group (MWAG), where she produced company-specific equity research on financial institutions and analyzed the sector's operating environment.

In 2013, Whitney de-registered MWAG and started her own hedge fund, Kenbelle Capital LP.

In December 2015, she joined Bermudian insurer Arch Capital Group as a manager overseeing outside investment firms.

From 2021–2022 Whitney was CFO of Kindbody, a high-growth health and technology company.

After 10 years of writing her last piece of analysis, in 2023 she relaunched her eponymous firm, Meredith Whitney Advisory Group, which specializes in macro and strategy-focused investment research.

== Professional recognition ==
Whitney issued a particularly pessimistic, but accurate, research report on Citigroup on October 31, 2007, to which many Wall Street analysts, and the news media, paid attention. She noted that the bank's dividends paid out to investors were greater than its profits at the time, and made the case that this would lead to bankruptcy. Shortly after the report's publication and a sharp drop in Citigroup's stock, Charles Prince resigned as the bank's CEO and his successor slashed the dividend. Earlier that year, Forbes magazine had listed Whitney as the second-best stock picker in the capital-market industry. Citigroup stock went on to lose 97% of its value by early 2009.

Whitney's extremely bearish view on banks landed her on the cover of the August 18, 2008, issue of Fortune magazine. Even before the problems that befell Merrill Lynch and Lehman Brothers in September, she said, "It feels like I'm at the epicenter of the biggest financial crisis in history." That year, Fortune listed her among the "50 Most Powerful Women in Business", The New York Post listed her among the "50 Most Powerful Women in New York City", and a CNBC viewer survey named her as "Power Player of the Year" over Jamie Dimon, Ben Bernanke, and Hank Paulson.

On December 19, 2010, in an interview on the CBS television program 60 Minutes, Whitney stated that 50 to 100 counties, cities, and towns in the United States would have "significant" municipal bond defaults totaling "hundreds of billions" of dollars, and that "it'll be something to worry about within the next 12 months." Since the record amount of municipal bond defaults in one year was just over $8 billion at the time, Whitney's comments about hundreds of billions in defaults briefly shook the market and drew a great deal of attention, much of it critical. According to Michael Lewis in Vanity Fair: "Many of the articles attacking her accused her of making a very specific forecast — as many as a hundred defaults within a year! — that failed to materialize... But that's not at all what she had said: her words were being misrepresented so that her message might be more easily attacked. 'She was referring to the complacency of the ratings agencies and investment advisers who say there is nothing to worry about,' said a person at 60 Minutes who reviewed the transcripts of the interview for me, to make sure I had heard what I thought I had heard. She says there is something to worry about, and it will be apparent to everyone in the next 12 months."

"A tale of two Americas is emerging: one weighed down by debt and facing de minimis economic growth and another brimming with opportunity and nimble to invest in the future." This was the thesis to Whitney's 2013 book, Fate of the States: The New Geography of American Prosperity. She argued that a "new map of prosperity" was emerging in the wake of the financial bust, with jobs moving away from the coasts and toward 17 "central corridor" states in the Midwest and Mountain West.

Whitney's municipal debt thesis is still considered valid by at least one analyst. In January 2018 S&P Global published an analysis by Mercer Capital titled "Meredith Whitney is Still Right."

== Personal life ==
On February 12, 2005, Whitney married professional wrestler John Layfield in Key West, Florida. Layfield is a former professional wrestler, and fellow Fox News Channel contributor.
