= Bank of Commerce Building (Oregon City, Oregon) =

Building in Oregon City, Oregon, U.S.

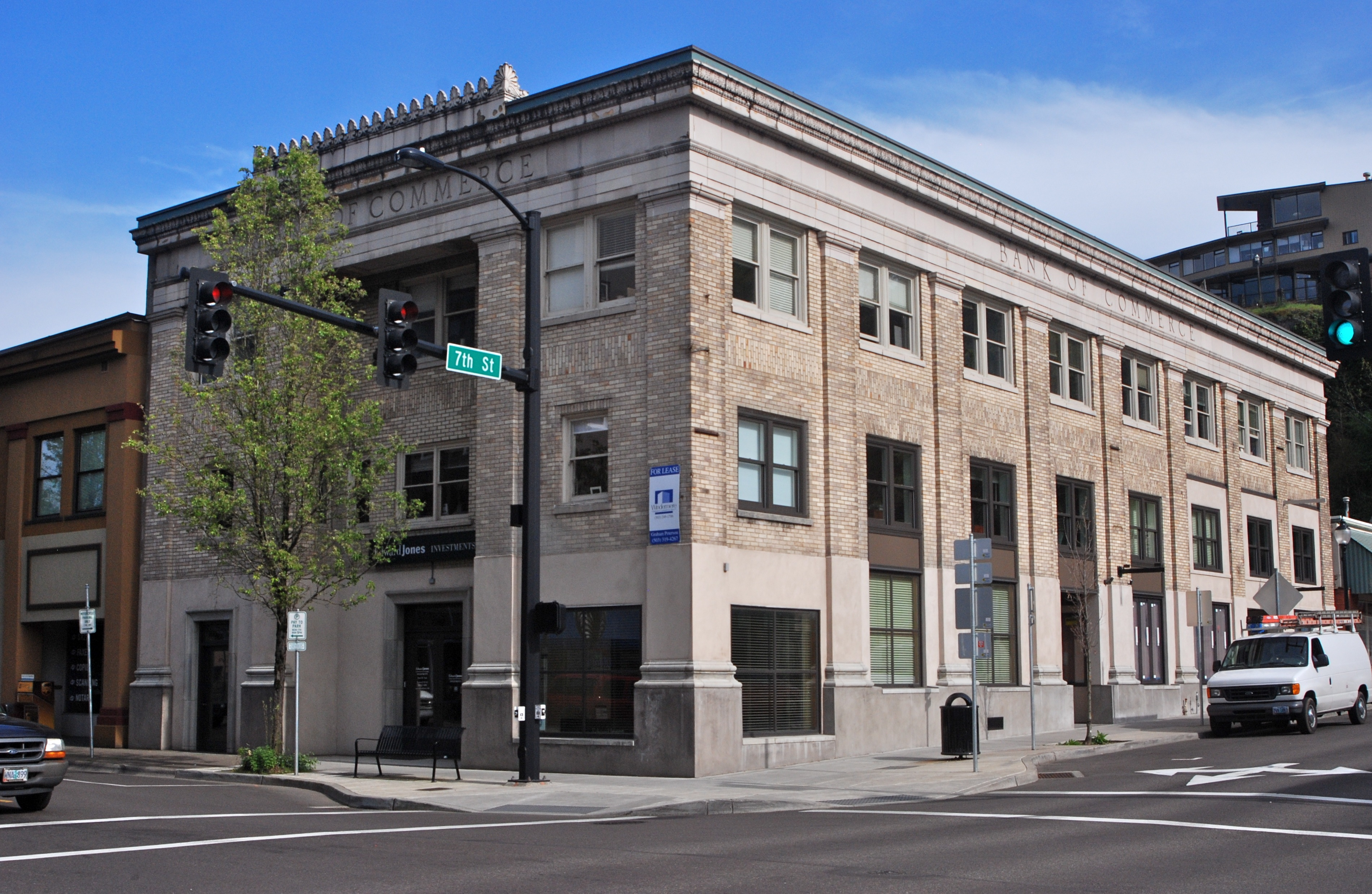
- The building's exterior, 2015
- Interactive map of the Bank of Commerce Building area

General information
- Type: Building
- Location: Oregon City, Oregon, United States
- Coordinates: 45.3578°N 122.6082°W
- Current tenants: Ingrid's Scandinavian Food and Second Son Kimbap

The Bank of Commerce Building is an historic building in Oregon City, Oregon, United States. In the early 2010s, the building's owners requested urban renewal grant funding in the amount of $40,000 to renovate exterior brick, masonry, and terra cotta, and add awnings and windows. The building houses the restaurants Ingrid's Scandinavian Food and Second Son Kimbap, as of late 2017.
