= Russell E. Harrison =

Canadian banker (1921–2014)

- Born: 31 May 1921; Grandview, Manitoba
- Died: 5 January 2014 (aged 92); Toronto, Ontario
- Education: University of Manitoba (BCom '42)
- Spouse: Nancy Doreen Bell (m. 1944)
- Military career
- Branch: Canadian Army
- Rank: Captain
- Unit: 1st Canadian Parachute Battalion
- Conflicts: World War II

Russell Edward Harrison (31 May 1921 – 5 January 2014) was a Canadian banker who served from 1973 to 1976 as president and from 1976 to 1985 as chairman of the board of the Canadian Imperial Bank of Commerce. After serving with the 1st Canadian Parachute Battalion in World War II, Harrison joined the Canadian Bank of Commerce in November 1945 in Winnipeg. Beginning in 1953, Harrison held several managerial position with the Bank of Commerce in Ontario and Quebec, and after its merger with the Imperial Bank of Canada in June 1961, with the new Canadian Imperial Bank of Commerce. In 1969, Harrison was appointed an executive vice-president at the bank's head office in Toronto, and in 1970 was elected a director. In December 1973 he succeeded Jeffery Page Rein Wadsworth as the bank's president, and in December 1976 succeeded Wadsworth as chairman of the board. Harrison retired as chairman in January 1985. He died on 5 January 2014 at age 92.

== Biography ==
Russell Edward Harrison was born in Grandview, Manitoba on 31 May 1921 to Edward Smith Harrison (1879–1943) and Annie Louise Purvis (1886–1946). During World War II, he served in Europe with the 1st Canadian Parachute Battalion. After the war, he joined the Canadian Bank of Commerce in Winnipeg in November 1945.

In November 1953, the bank appointed him assistant manager in Hamilton, Ontario, and in January 1956 an assistant manager in Toronto. In October 1956 he became chief inspector of the bank, and in December 1956 he became regional superintendent and assistant general manager in Montreal. After the Bank of Commerce merged with the Imperial Bank of Canada in June 1961, Harrison began working for the new Canadian Imperial Bank of Commerce. In August 1969 he was assigned to the bank's head office in Toronto, where he was appointed an executive vice-president and chief general manager. Harrison was elected a director in December 1970.

On 11 December 1973, Harrison succeeded Jeffery Page Rein Wadsworth as president, while Wadsworth succeeded Neil John McKinnon as chairman of the board. Harrison remained president until 14 December 1976, when he succeeded Wadsworth as chairman, and was replaced as president by Robert Donald Fullerton. Harrison retired as chairman on 17 January 1985.

Harrison was a member of the Toronto Club, Albany Club, York Club, Ontario Club, University Club of Toronto, Ontario Jockey Club, Saint James's Club, Mount Royal Club, Ranchmen's Club, and Rosedale Golf Club. He served as a director of Dominion Realty, Royal Insurance, Canada Life, Falconbridge, TransCanada Pipelines, and Western Assurance.

On 18 October 1944, Harrison married Nancy Doreen Bell. They had two children, Deirdre and Alan. Harrison died in Toronto on 5 January 2014 at age 92 after having suffered from Crohn's disease. A funeral was held on 9 January at Morley Bedford Funeral Services.
