= George Herbert Wood =

Canadian businessman

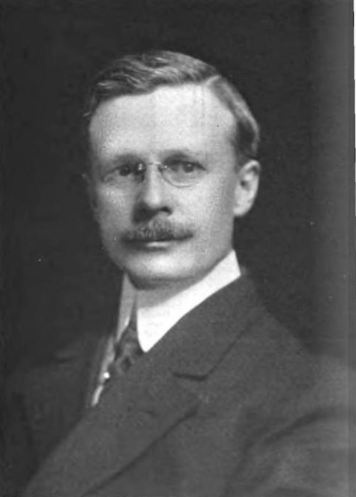
- Born: February 17, 1867; Rock Ferry, England
- Died: May 15, 1949 (aged 82); Toronto, Ontario
- Resting place: Mount Pleasant Cemetery
- Occupation: Businessman
- Spouse: Maude Staveley (m. 1892; died 1929)

George Herbert Wood (February 17, 1867 – May 15, 1949) was a Canadian businessman who co-founded Wood Gundy and Company, stockbrokerage in Toronto in 1905 with fellow former Dominion Securities employee James Henry Gundy.

== Early years ==
Wood was born in Rock Ferry, England, on February 17, 1867, and arrived in Canada as child with his family in 1874.

After graduation Wood worked for his father George William Wood at Atlas Assurance Company before moving on to Dominion Securities. He retired from the business in 1930 and died at his home in Toronto in 1949.

== Personal ==
In 1892 he married Maude Staveley and divided their time in Toronto and in England.

Wood and his wife are buried at Mount Pleasant Cemetery, Toronto.

== Legacy ==
His name and that of Gundy lives in the retail investment arm of CIBC World Markets.
