= CIBC-FM =

Radio station in Saskatchewan, Canada

Coordinates: 50.5799°N 102.6599°W

CIBC-FM is a low-power Type B Native radio station which provides First Nations community radio programming on the frequency of 98.1 MHz/FM in Cowessess, Saskatchewan, Canada. The station is owned by Cowessess Community Projects Inc., which received approval from the CRTC on May 9, 2012. In the application, the station said that it would broadcast at least ten hours a week in Cree, with the remainder of its programming in English.
