= Global Risk Institute =

Canadian think tank and organization

The Global Risk Institute (GRI) is a Toronto-based organization focused on risk management for the financial services sector. It provides members with "knowledge and tools" in the forms of events, publications, and education programs aimed at actionable insights, and at capability building more generally. Its research and education initiatives are in partnership with various universities in North America and Europe. It was founded in 2011 (then called "Global Risk Institute in Financial Services") by the governments of Ontario and of Canada, together with 16 leading Canadian financial institutions. Today, it has 40+ institutional members. Sonia Baxendale is CEO.
