= Bank of Commerce Building (Windsor, Ontario) =

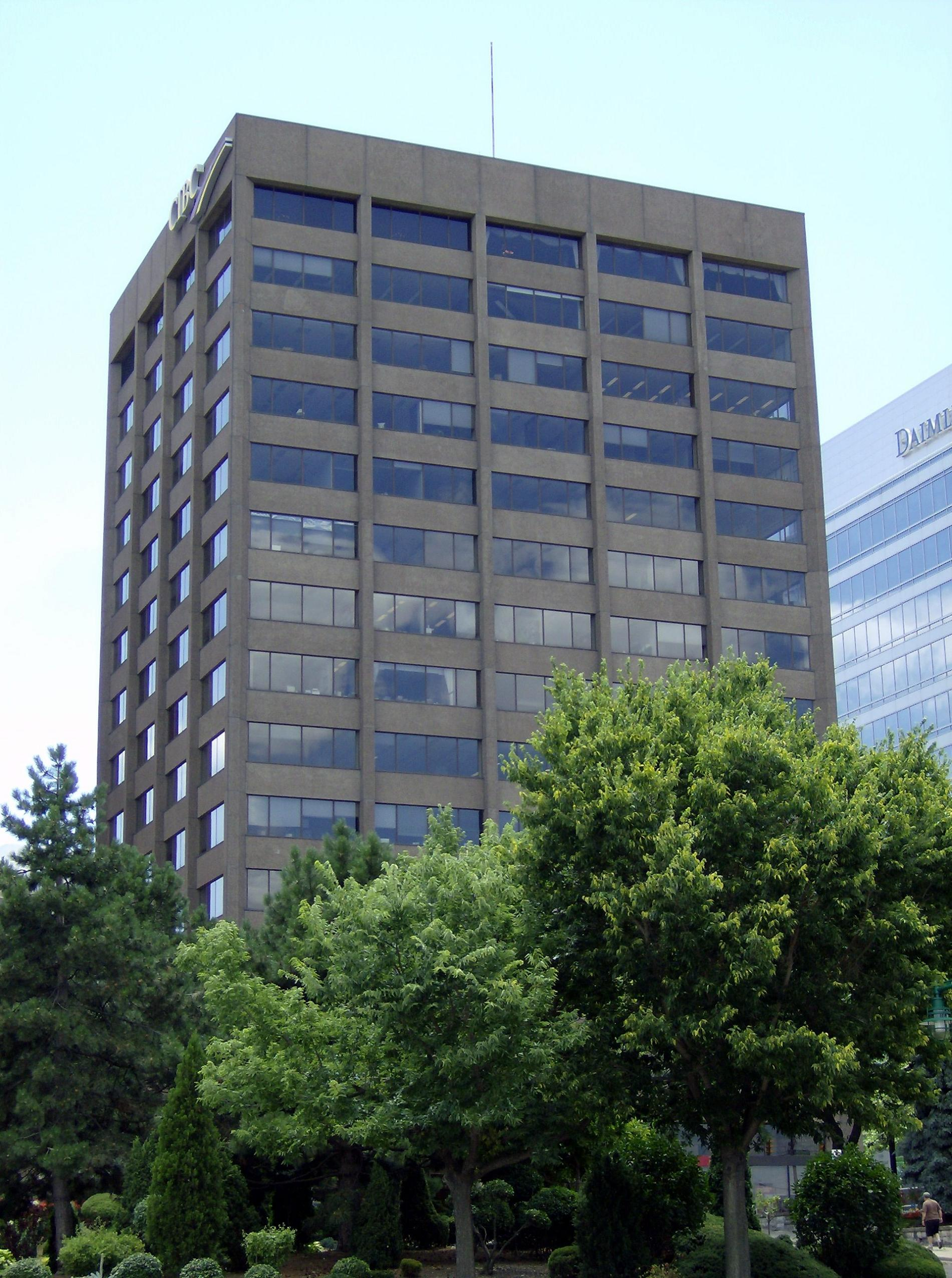
- Interactive map of the Bank of Commerce Building area

General information
- Type: office
- Location: 100 Ouellette Avenue; Windsor, Ontario; N9A 6T3
- Coordinates: 42°19′10.0″N 83°2′23.6″W
- Completed: 1974

Technical details
- Floor count: 19 (15 + 4 underground)
- Floor area: 117,033 sq ft (10,872.7 m^{2})

The Bank of Commerce Building is a 15-storey office tower constructed in 1974 in Windsor, Ontario, Canada.

The structure is designed in the modern style and faced with precast panels with brown exposed aggregate which cover the vertical piers and spandrels. The windows are set in horizontal groups of four and recessed in dark aluminum frames. It is connected to the neighbouring Windsor Downtown Travelodge Hotel.

The building previously housed a Canadian Imperial Bank of Commerce (CIBC) regional headquarters. The CIBC sign at the top of the building has since been removed but CIBC still maintains a main branch on the first floor. Other tenants include the Great Lakes Regional Office of the International Joint Commission.

The private Windsor Club occupied the 14th floor from 1987 through November 2015 when it relocated elsewhere in the city. Building owners remodeled the space to accommodate a restaurant which opened on June 9, 2016.

West across Ouellette Avenue is One Riverside Drive, headquarters of FCA Canada and to the north, across Riverside Drive is the Riverfront Bike Trail.
