= James Henry Gundy =

Canadian businessman (1880–1951)

- Born: 22 March 1880; Harriston, Ontario
- Died: 10 November 1951 (aged 71); Toronto, Ontario
- Education: Windsor Collegiate Institute
- Spouse: Serena Lake Clarke (m. 1904)

James Henry Gundy (22 March 1880 – 10 November 1951) was a Canadian businessman who co-founded Wood Gundy and Company, stockbrokerage in Toronto, Ontario in 1905.

He was born in Harriston, Ontario and at age eighteen moved to Toronto, where he was employed by Central Canada Loan and Savings Co., a company started by George Albertus Cox. In 1900 he joined the newly formed stock brokerage firm, Dominion Securities In 1905 he and fellow Dominion Securities employee George Herbert Wood teamed up to go into the municipal and provincial bond underwriting business. They formed Wood Gundy and Company with offices on the corner of King and Yonge streets in downtown Toronto.

Gundy became a successful and influential member of the Canadian financial community. During World War I, he was chair of Special Subscriptions Committee - Victory Loans 1911–1918. He served as president of the Investment Dealers Association of Canada 1920–1921, was a Governor of the Investment Bankers' Association of America, and served on the board of directors of Canada Cement, Massey-Harris, Simpsons Ltd, Dominion Steel and Coal Company.

Gundy donated the land for Serena Gundy Park in Toronto, named in his first wife's memory. His son Charles Lake Gundy became president of Wood Gundy and served until his death in 1978.

He died in 1951 and was buried in the Mount Pleasant Cemetery, Toronto.
