= R. Donald Fullerton =

Canadian banker 1931–2011

- Born: 7 June 1931; Vancouver, British Columbia
- Died: 29 May 2011 (aged 79); Toronto, Ontario
- Education: Trinity College School ('49); University of Toronto (BA 1953)
- Spouse(s): Charlotte Knowlton Lyle (m. 1954) Judith Ann Stewart (m. 1975)

Robert Donald Fullerton (7 June 1931 – 29 May 2011) was a Canadian banker who served from 1976 to 1986 as president and from 1985 to 1992 as chairman of the Canadian Imperial Bank of Commerce. Fullerton joined the Canadian Bank of Commerce in 1953. In 1961 the Bank of Commerce merged with the Imperial Bank of Canada, and by 1967 Fullerton was assigned to the new bank's head office in Toronto. In 1971 he became a vice-president and in 1973 an executive vice-president. Fullerton was appointed president in 1976, in 1984 was appointed chief executive officer, and in 1985 was elected chairman of the board. He retired as chairman and chief executive In June 1992. Fullerton died in Toronto on 29 May 2011 at age 79.

== Early life and education ==
Robert Donald Fullerton was born in Vancouver on 7 June 1931 to Carman Gardiner Fullerton (1898–1967) and Mary Muriel Elderkin (1898–1980). He had two siblings, Margaret (1934–2022) and Carman Gardiner "Jim" (19??–1993). Fullerton attended Forest Hill Village High School in Toronto, then Trinity College School in Port Hope, where he graduated in 1949. He then attended the University of Toronto, where he graduated Bachelor of Arts in 1953. While at university, Fullerton was a member of Kappa Alpha Society.

== Career ==
Upon graduation, Fullerton joined the Canadian Bank of Commerce in Vancouver. On 1 June 1961, the Bank of Commerce merged with the Imperial Bank of Canada to become the Canadian Imperial Bank of Commerce. That year, Fullerton was transferred to Toronto where he became the assistant manager of the city hall branch. In 1964 he was appointed an agent and transferred to Toronto, then in 1966 was made regional general manager in Regina. Fullerton was assigned to the head office in Toronto in 1967, where he became regional general manager, international. In 1968 he was appointed deputy chief general manager of operations. In 1971 he became a senior vice-president, and in 1973 an executive vice-president.

On 14 December 1976, Fullerton was appointed president of the bank, succeeding Russell Edward Harrison. The presidency came along with the title of chief operating officer. In August 1980, he gained the additional title of vice-chairman. In 1980, amid struggles at the bank, Fullerton attempted to a coup to seize Harrison's office. Ultimately, he failed to win the support of the board. Harrison punished Fullerton for his insubordination by stripping him of the chief operating officer role, and assigning him to work on strategic planning. However, by 1983, Harrison was enmeshed in the mess of the bank's loan to Dome Petroleum. Fullerton devised a plan to streamline the bank, which was, according to an insider, the "answer to the board's prayer."

In May 1984, Fullerton succeeded Harrison as chief executive officer, while Harrison remained chairman. On 17 January 1985, Harrison announced his retirement as chairman, and Fullerton was elected as his replacement. At this time, Harrison was in the rare position of being the bank's president, chairman, and chief executive. In April 1986, Fullerton reorganised the bank into three business units, each of which would have its own president. The personal banking division was headed by Warren Moysey, the corporate banking unit by Alvin Flood, and the investment banking unit by Paul Cantor. Fullerton retired as chairman and chief executive on 7 June 1992, and was succeeded in both roles by Alvin Flood.

== Board memberships ==
Fullerton was a member of the York Club, Toronto Club, Rosedale Golf Club, Granite Club, Caledon Ski Club, Queen's Club, Mount Royal Club, and Metropolitan Club. He served as a director of IBM Canada, Amoco Canada, North American Life, Husky Oil, Westcoast Transmission Company, Honeywell, George Weston, Alcan, Coca-Cola, Ontario Hydro, Wellesley Hospital, Canadian Eastern Finance, and Massey Ferguson. He was a governor of Crescent School and Bishop Strachan School, and was the honorary treasurer of the Royal Ontario Museum. Fullerton was a member of the United Church of Canada.

== Personal life ==
On 10 April 1954 at Rosedale Presbyterian Church, Fullerton married Charlotte Knowlton Lyle (1930–1974). They had four children: Robert, Geoffrey, Stephen, and Bruce. After Charlotte's death in 1974, he remarried on 16 October 1975 to Judith Ann (née Stewart) Frankel, the widow of Alan Hartman Frankel (1929–1974). Fullerton died on Sunday, 29 May 2011 at St. Michael's Hospital in Toronto, a week short of turning 80. A funeral was held on 1 June at Grace Church on-the-Hill. He was interred with his late wife at Mount Pleasant Cemetery.
