= Oppenheimer Holdings =

American multinational independent investment bank

Oppenheimer Holdings Inc.

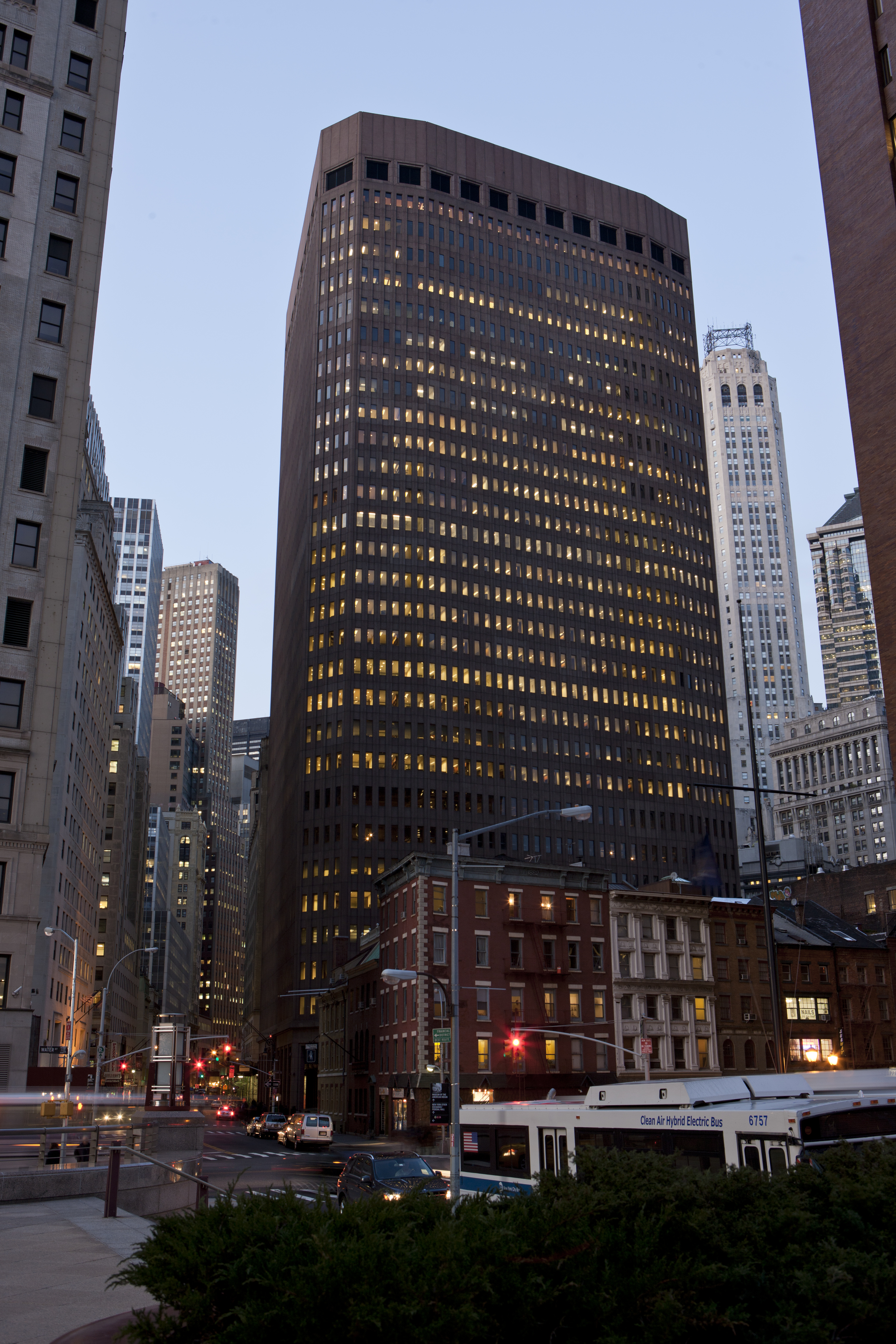
- Headquarters in New York City
- Type: Public
- Traded as: NYSE: OPY
- Industry: Financial services
- Founded: 1881; 145 years ago
- Founder: Harris C. Fahnestock
- Headquarters: New York City, United States
- Number of locations: 89 (2024)
- Key people: Robert Lowenthal (chairman and CEO)
- Products: Wealth Management; Investment Banking; Capital Markets
- Revenue: ▲US$1.64 billion (2025)
- Net income: ▲US$148 million (2025)
- AUM: ▲US$49.4 billion (2024)
- Total assets: ▲US$3.72 billion (2025)
- Total equity: ▲US$984 million (2025)
- Number of employees: 3,018 (2024)
- Website: oppenheimer.com

Oppenheimer Holdings Inc. is an American multinational independent investment bank and financial services company offering investment banking, financial advisory services, capital markets services, asset management, wealth management, and related products and services worldwide. The company, which once occupied the One World Financial Center building in Manhattan, now bases its operations at 85 Broad Street in New York City.

== History ==
Originally created as Oppenheimer & Company and named for German-American investment broker Max E. Oppenheimer (c. 1899–1964), a Jewish refugee from the Nazis who advised the Synagogue Council of America and worked at a New Hampshire real estate firm, a Bay Area savings and loan association, and Lehman Brothers, Oppenheimer Holdings was founded in 1950 when a partnership was created to act as a broker-dealer and manage related financial services for large institutional clients. While the 1960s and 1970s was a time of great prosperity for the company, the origins of the firm trace back to 1881. After re-configuring operations in 1975, Oppenheimer & Co. formed three operating subsidiaries:

- Oppenheimer & Co. Inc., a retail brokerage firm
- Oppenheimer Capital Corporation, an institutional investment manager
- Oppenheimer Management Corp. (subsequently spun off into OppenheimerFunds, a mutual fund business, which was later acquired by Invesco)

In the 1980s, OpCo founding partners began looking for a buyer. Mercantile House Holdings, PLC, a publicly owned British corporation, made an offer in 1982, which was accepted and closed a year later. In 1986, a majority interest was bought in Oppenheimer & Co. and Oppenheimer Capital by the firm's management, chairman and CEO Stephen Robert and president Nathan Gantcher, along with a small group of their colleagues from Mercantile, for $150 million. A year later, British & Commonwealth Holdings, PLC, acquired Mercantile. The 1990s brought another separation of the original firm when Oppenheimer Capital's senior personnel acquired a majority interest in the subsidiary and separated from OpCo.

In 1990, MassMutual acquired Oppenheimer Management Corporation from British and Commonwealth Holdings PLC for $150 million as part of its strategy to diversify into mutual funds management.

In 1995, Robert and Gantcher, who controlled about 40 percent of OpCo's equity, became eager to locate additional capital to grow their firm. At first, OpCo explored options of forming a possible alliance with ING Groep NV that eventually fell through. Carrying on with this goal, management set out to merge with a bulge bracket bank that had access to the foreign markets.

Robert and Gantcher entertained offers from the second-largest private German financial institution and retail bank, Bayerische Vereinsbank. On May 8, 1997, The Wall Street Journal announced that Pittsburgh-based PNC Bank Corp. was in talks to buy Oppenheimer & Co. for about $500 million in cash, stock, and options. Despite that, according to the article's source, PNC and Oppenheimer hadn't arrived at a fixed price and that chatter could break the formal agreement. 13 days following the announcement, the Bloomberg News desk announced that for the third time in two years, OpCo had been abandoned by a prospective buyer. Two months later, it was announced that CIBC wanted to expand its brokerage business and was interested in Oppenheimer.

=== CIBC Oppenheimer ===
In 1997, CIBC Wood Gundy acquired Oppenheimer Holdings for $525 million and paid over for the next three years and included $175 million in order to retain the loyalty of key Oppenheimer executives who were not shareholders in the closely held private firm. When the deal was closed, the firm's name was changed to CIBC Oppenheimer Holdings. In 2003, CIBC made the decision to sell Oppenheimer's retail brokerage business and name for $257 million to Fahnestock Viner Holdings, which subsequently changed its name to Oppenheimer.

=== Fahnestock Viner Holdings ===
Fahnestock Viner traces its lineage back to Harris C. Fahnestock, an investment banker who was a founding member of one of Citigroup's predecessors, the First National Bank of New York. In 1881, Harris' son William formed his own investment bank at Two Wall Street, Fahnestock & Co., which expanded through the decades and was eventually acquired in 1988 by E.A. Viner Holdings, Ltd. The new company, Fahnestock Viner Holdings, would eventually change its name in 2003 upon the acquisition of CIBC Oppenheimer's retail brokerage business (the Private Client and U.S. Asset Management Divisions).

In 2001, prior to acquiring Oppenheimer, Fahnestock acquired another investment bank, Josephthal & Co. Inc.

Edward A. Viner Holdings, which was Toronto-based company, was managed by Albert “Bud” Lowenthal when it acquired Fahnestock for $7.3 million.

=== CIBC World Markets ===
On November 4, 2007, CIBC announced that it agreed to sell to Oppenheimer & Co. its American domestic investment banking, equities, leveraged finance, and related debt capital markets businesses. The transaction also included CIBC's Israeli investment banking and equities business, and certain parts of other U.S. capital markets-related businesses located in the UK and Asia. The acquired businesses by Oppenheimer had over 700 employees and annual revenue of 400 million. According to the agreement, Oppenheimer borrowed $100 million from CIBC in the form of a subordinated debt. Additionally, CIBC agreed to provide an initial $1.5 billion lending, to the entity for financing the syndicated loans for American middle-market companies. CIBC President and Chief Executive Gerry McCaughey said, "It [transaction] will permit CIBC to redeploy capital over time to further support the continued growth of our strong and profitable U.S. and international operations, as well as our core Canadian businesses." The deal was closed on January 14, 2008.

=== Settlements with US regulators ===
In January 2015, Oppenheimer & Co. paid $20 million in civil settlements with U.S. regulators, who had alleged that the group had improperly sold penny stocks and did not take adequate steps to fight money laundering.

== Ownership ==
As of 2020, the company has Class A non-voting stock which is publicly traded, while 98% of the Class B voting stock is owned by its chairman Albert G. Lowenthal.

Albert Lowenthal became CEO of predecessor company Edward A. Viner Holdings (E.A. Viner) by buying a controlling stake in 1985 and used that company to purchase various other companies, continuing to hold the position of CEO as of 2024. He began his career at Cowen & Co. in 1967.

As of February 27, 2025, Oppenheimer Holdings Inc. announced that Albert G. Lowenthal will step down as CEO on May 5, 2025, while continuing as Chairman and Executive Chairman of Opco. Robert S. Lowenthal, currently President and Head of Investment Banking, will succeed him as CEO and President. Under Albert Lowenthal's leadership since 1985, the company expanded from $5 million in revenue to $1.4 billion in 2024.

== Major locations ==
United States

- New York City
- Atlanta
- Boston
- Denver
- Houston
- Los Angeles
- San Francisco
- Stamford

International

- London, United Kingdom
- Hong Kong, China SAR
- Tel Aviv, Israel
- Geneva, Switzerland
- Frankfurt, Germany

== Notable current and former equity research analysts ==
=== Business ===
- Henry Blodget – equity research analyst
- Russ Dallen – Latin American research analyst
- Steve Eisman – equity research analyst
- Israel Englander, billionaire hedge fund manager
- Leon Levy who co-founded the Oppenheimer mutual funds in 1959
- Meredith Whitney – equity research analyst
- Carter Braxton Worth – technical analyst

== See also ==
- List of investment banks
- Boutique investment bank
- CIBC World Markets
- Wood Gundy Inc.
