= Wood Gundy =

Canadian stock brokerage and investment banking firm

Wood Gundy Inc.
- Industry: Securities
- Founded: 1 February 1905
- Defunct: 1988
- Fate: Acquired by Canadian Imperial Bank of Commerce
- Successor: CIBC Wood Gundy; CIBC World Markets
- Headquarters: Toronto, Ontario, Canada
- Products: Brokerage

Wood Gundy Inc. was a leading Canadian stock brokerage and investment banking firm. Founded in 1905, it was acquired by the Canadian Imperial Bank of Commerce in 1988 as it attempted to build an investment banking business. The Wood Gundy name was used extensively by the bank's investment banking arm, which was known as CIBC Wood Gundy until 1997. Today, CIBC's investment banking business is known as CIBC World Markets, and the name CIBC Wood Gundy is used as the brand for the bank's retail brokerage business.

== History ==
=== Founding and early history ===
Wood, Gundy & Company was established in Toronto, Ontario, in 1905 by George Herbert Wood and James Henry Gundy. The firm first specialized in the distribution and underwriting of government and municipal bonds. In 1919, the firm opened an office in New York City. Founded as a partnership, the firm incorporated in 1925.

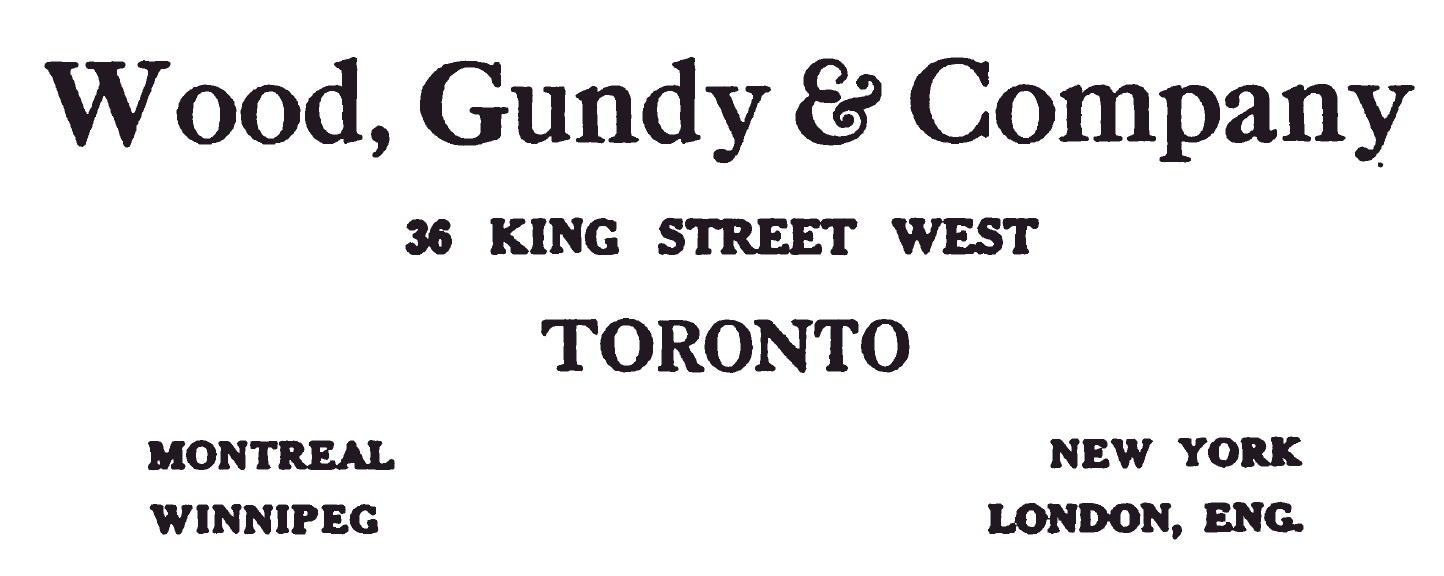
Original Wood Gundy & Company logo c. 1921

Following World War II, Wood Gundy expanded its operations, starting to underwrite and distribute securities of Canadian corporations. Continued growth was driven through Canada's increasing industrialization and growing population, leading to greater demand for capital and investment securities. This expansion transformed Wood Gundy into a full-service investment house. Wood Gundy was the first Canadian dealer to open an office in Tokyo, and the first firm to employ a female trader on the floor of the Toronto Stock Exchange.

The operations of the company, then called "Wood, Gundy & Company Limited", were split into two newly incorporated companies in 1962. The first, responsible for investment dealer operations, was called "Wood Gundy Securities Limited". The second, responsible for the investment holding business, was named "Wood Gundy Holdings Limited". These two firms existed until the early 1970s, when they reunited as a single firm under the name "Wood Gundy Limited". At this time, Charles Gundy, the son of the founder, was Chairman. Wood Gundy remained the largest brokerage and securities firm in Canada until the early 1980s, when the merger of Dominion Securities and A.E. Ames created the largest firm in the country.

=== Acquisition by CIBC ===
By the mid-1980s, Wood Gundy, which was owned by approximately 600 of its employees, was looking for a merger partner. In 1986, Wood Gundy had nearly merged with Gordon Capital Corporation, but that deal was aborted at the last minute. By 1987, there were a number of banks actively pursuing a deal with Wood Gundy, including First National Bank of Chicago, the Union Bank of Switzerland and the Royal Bank of Canada, however these deals fell apart in the middle of the year due to high price expectations. The firm was impacted by the 1987 stock market crash in October 1987 and intensified its efforts to find a buyer.

CIBC purchased a 60 percent stake in Wood Gundy in June 1988 for C$110 million (US$86 million), representing a total value of the firm of C$183 (US$143 million). At the time of its acquisition, Wood Gundy was the leading Canadian investment dealer. Following the acquisition, CIBC formed CIBC Wood Gundy, which offered primarily asset management services for corporate and institutional clients.

Two years later, in 1990, CIBC continued to expand in the Canadian securities business by acquiring much of Merrill Lynch & Company's Canadian securities business. The acquisition included 20 offices and between 700 and 800 employees as well as access for CIBC to Merrill's equity research. The transaction made Wood Gundy once again the largest brokerage firm in Canada. In 2001, CIBC would buy the remainder of Merrill's Canadian business.

In 1997, CIBC Wood Gundy acquired the U.S. brokerage house Oppenheimer & Co. After the acquisition the U.S. division took the name CIBC Oppenheimer, eliminating the use of the Wood Gundy brand through much of the bank.

== Leadership ==
=== President ===
1. James Henry Gundy, 1925–1948
2. Charles Lake Gundy, 1948–1967
3. William Price Wilder, 1967–1972
4. Charles Edward Medland, 1972–1982
5. Walter Donald Bean, 1982–1988
6. John Stewart Hunkin, 1988–1990
7. Richard Venn, 1990–1992
8. Jim Beqaj, 1992–1996
9. Wayne Fox, 1996–199?

=== Chairman of the Board ===
1. George Herbert Wood, 1925–1932
2. James Henry Gundy, 1948–1951
3. Alan Holmes Williamson, 1959–1960
4. William Pearson Scott, 1959–1967
5. Charles Lake Gundy, 1967–1978
6. Charles Edward Medland, 1978–1988
7. George Edmund King, 1988–1992
8. Richard Venn, 1992–199?
