= Burlington Transit =

Public transport agency in Burlington, Ontario, Canada

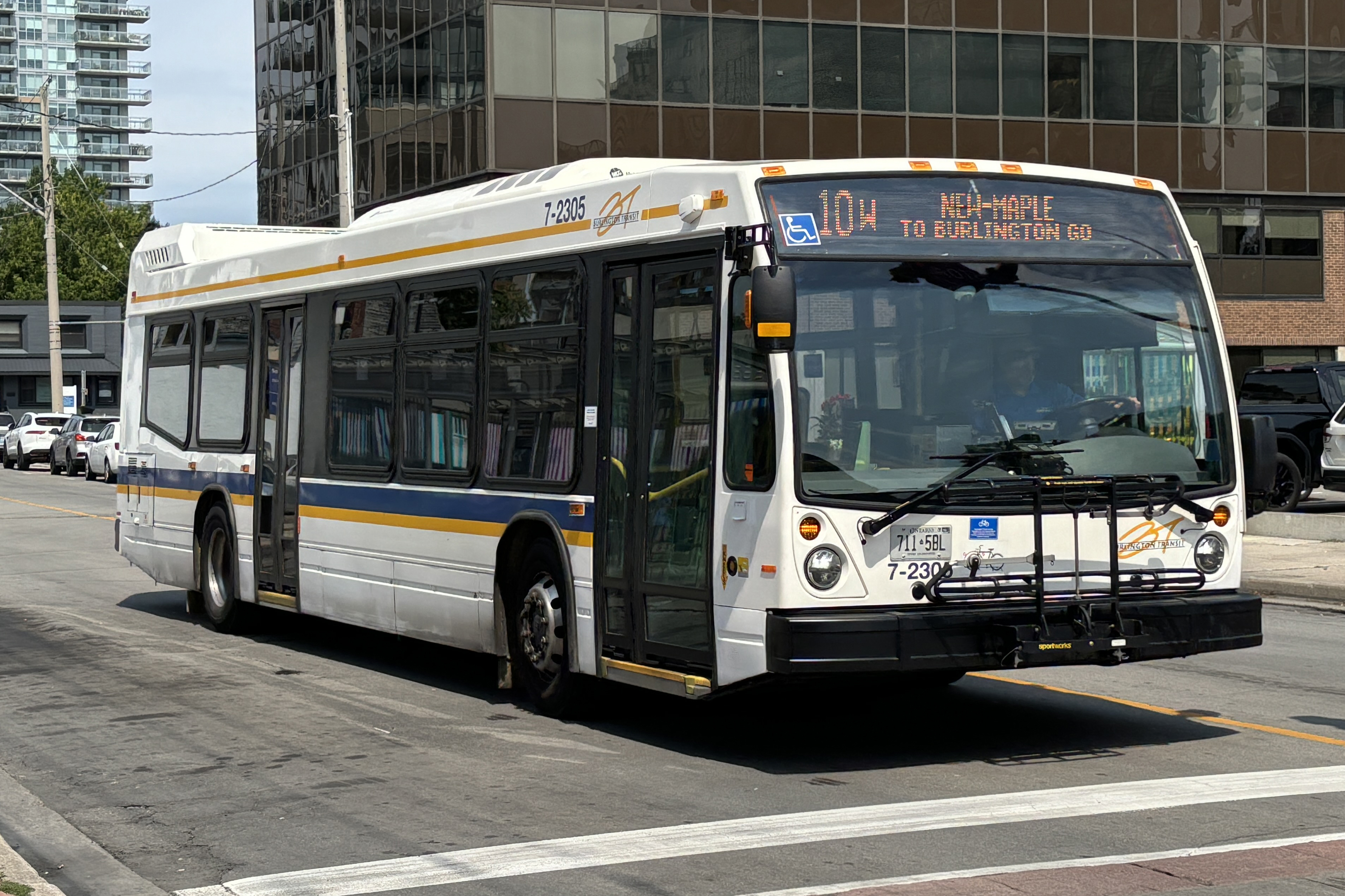
- Founded: September 1975 (51 years ago)
- Headquarters: 3332 Harvester Road
- Locale: Burlington, Ontario
- Service area: Burlington; Hamilton; Oakville
- Service type: Bus service
- Routes: 16
- Stops: 763
- Hubs: Burlington GO Station, Downtown Terminal, Fairview St & Brant St, Fairview St & Guelph Line.
- Stations: Aldershot GO Station, Appleby GO Station, Burlington GO Station
- Fleet: 59 (40 foot buses), 11 (30 foot buses).
- Fuel type: Diesel, hybrid electric
- Operator: City of Burlington
- Website: burlingtontransit.ca

Burlington Transit is the public transit agency in Burlington, Ontario, Canada. Services began in September 1975, after the city had been served by neighbouring systems including Hamilton Street Railway (HSR) and former subsidiary Canada Coach Lines, as well as "local" services to and from Toronto once provided by Gray Coach Lines and GO Transit along Lakeshore Road (Highway 2).

Burlington Transit is a member of the Canadian Urban Transit Association, and their union is run by Canadian Union of Public Employees Local #2723.

It connects with Hamilton Street Railway to the south and west and Oakville Transit to the east. In addition, the Appleby, Burlington, and Aldershot GO Transit stations on the Lakeshore West line are also connected. Burlington Transit operates a partial grid network using the GO stations and a downtown terminal as transfer points.

== Services ==
=== Routes ===
All regular routes are serviced by accessible low-floor buses, which all feature priority designated seating & additionally wheelchair ramps at the front doors.

No.	Name	Inner terminal	Outer terminal	Notes
1	Plains-Fairview	Appleby GO Station	Downtown Hamilton (King at James)	Via Burlington GO via on street bays.
2	Brant Street	Downtown Terminal	Highway 407 Carpool	Via Burlington GO
3	Guelph	Downtown Terminal	Highway 407 Carpool	Via Burlington Centre
4	Central	Aldershot GO Station	Appleby GO Station	Via Downtown Terminal, Central Library, Burlington Centre, and Appleby Mall.
6	Headon	Burlington GO Station	Highway 407 Carpool	Via Mainway and Haber Recreation Ctr.
10	New–Maple	Burlington GO Station	Appleby GO Station	Via Mapleview Centre, Downtown Transit Terminal, and Lakeside Plaza.
11	Sutton–Alton	Appleby GO Station	Highway 407 Carpool	Via Corpus Christi Secondary School and Haber Community Ctr.
12	Upper Middle	Burlington GO Station	Burlington North SmartCentre	Via Millcroft Mall Plaza (Heron Way)
25	Walkers	Appleby GO Station	Highway 407 Carpool	
48	Milcroft	Corpus Christi	Dr. Frank J. Hayden Secondary School / Haber Recreation Ctr	Limited school service (weekdays, September–June)
50	Burlington South	Burlington GO Station		Night service only (11:00 pm – 1:30 am)
51	Burlington Northeast	Burlington GO Station		Night service only (11:00 pm – 1:30 am)
52	Burlington Northwest	Burlington GO Station		Night service only (11:00 pm – 1:30 am)
80	Harvester	Burlington GO Station	Appleby GO Station	Via Burlington Transit Operations Facility. Weekday service only.
81	North Service	Burlington GO Station	Appleby GO Station	Weekday service only
87	North Service – Aldershot	Burlington GO Station	Aldershot GO Station	Weekday service only

=== Connecting transit ===
Oakville Transit routes:

- 14 Lakeshore West – runs along the eastern perimeter of Burlington on Burloak Drive into the Appleby GO.
- 5 Dundas – runs along Dundas Street into the GO 407 Carpool.

Hamilton Street Railway routes:

- 11 Parkdale – runs from Downtown Transit Terminal, via Beach Boulevard, Parkdale Avenue and the Red Hill Valley Parkway to Valley Park Loop in the Stoney Creek area of southeastern Hamilton.
- 18 Waterdown – runs north from Aldershot GO Station to provide service to Waterdown.

GO Transit routes:

- Burlington Transit connects with GO Transit at Appleby, Burlington, Aldershot stations and at the Highway 407 carpool lot.

Via Rail and Amtrak routes:

- Burlington Transit and Hamilton Street Railway buses connect with Via Rail (Canada's national passenger inter-city train services) and Amtrak trains to the United States at Aldershot station.

=== Paratransit ===
Burlington Transit operates door-to-door service for people with physical disabilities, which is called "Handi-Van".

== Fares ==
Sale of paper tickets to the general public ended on August 31, 2019, and were no longer accepted as payment after December 31, 2019. Fares shown here are effective January 1, 2026.

Age group	Cash or credit/debit card	Presto e-purse
Youth (13–19)	$3.75	$2.00 (On weekdays from 6pm until end of service and all-day on weekends it is fare-free)
Adult (20–64)	$3.75	$2.85
Seniors (65+)	$3.75	Free

With a Presto card, teenagers ride free from 6 pm to end of service on weekdays and all-day on weekends, while seniors can ride fare free all-day everyday. Under the fare capping program, teenagers ride free after 20 paid trips in a calendar month from the start of service in the morning until 6pm on weekdays while adults ride for free after 40 full fare rides paid per calendar month. Children ages 12 and under can ride fare-free on Burlington Transit when they use their child concession Presto card or when accompanied by a fare-paying customer.

Riders paying by cash (or, in some cases, special purpose paper tickets) can request a paper transfer from the bus driver; for riders using Presto cards or credit/debit cards, the transfer is automatically recorded on the card. They are valid for two hours from the time of boarding the first bus and can be used to transfer between Burlington Transit (BT) buses in any direction – as well as to transfer to other neighbouring local municipal transit services across the Greater Toronto and Hamilton Area such as MiWay, Oakville Transit and Hamilton Street Railway buses – without having to pay another fare.

Riders transferring from GO Transit to BT buses receive free admission when they show their valid GO ticket or day pass to the driver or when swiping the Presto card, credit or debit card. Passengers transferring from BT to GO Transit services will be reimbursed the difference between the BT fare and the co-fare discount upon disembarking GO Transit.

== Stations, terminals and garages ==
- Burlington GO Station - Routes 1 Plains-Fairview (via on street bays), 2 Brant, 6 Headon, 10 New-Maple, 50 Burlington South, 51 Burlington Northeast, 52 Burlington Northwest, 80 Harvester, and 81 North Service service this station.
- Appleby GO Station - Routes 1 Plains-Fairview, 4 Central, 10 New-Maple, 11 Sutton-Alton 25 Walkers, 80 Harvester, 81 North Service, and Oakville Transit Route 14 / 14A Lakeshore serve this station.
- Aldershot GO Station - Routes 4 Central and 87 North Service - Aldershot, Hamilton Street Railway's Route 18 Waterdown Mountaineer, and GO Transit bus routes 15 and 18 stop here.
- Wal-Mart Rio-Can Smartcentre Plaza at Appleby Line & Dundas Street - Route 12 services this plaza.
- Dundas St. @ Highway 407 Park & Ride (Burlington Carpool Lot) - Routes 2 Brant, 3 Guelph Line, 6 Headon, 11 Sutton-Alton, 25 Walkers, and Oakville Transit's route 5/5A Dundas stop here.
- Downtown Transit Terminal - Routes 2 Brant, 3 Guelph Line, 4 Central, 10 New-Maple, Hamilton Street Railway's route 11 Parkdale, 50 Burlington South (LATE NIGHT) and 52 Burlington Northwest (LATE NIGHT) service this bus terminal.
- Main garage: Burlington Transit's Operations Facility at 3332 Harvester Road. (Route 80 is the only way to publicly access the facility and the garage).

=== Downtown Transit Terminal ===
Downtown Burlington, John St
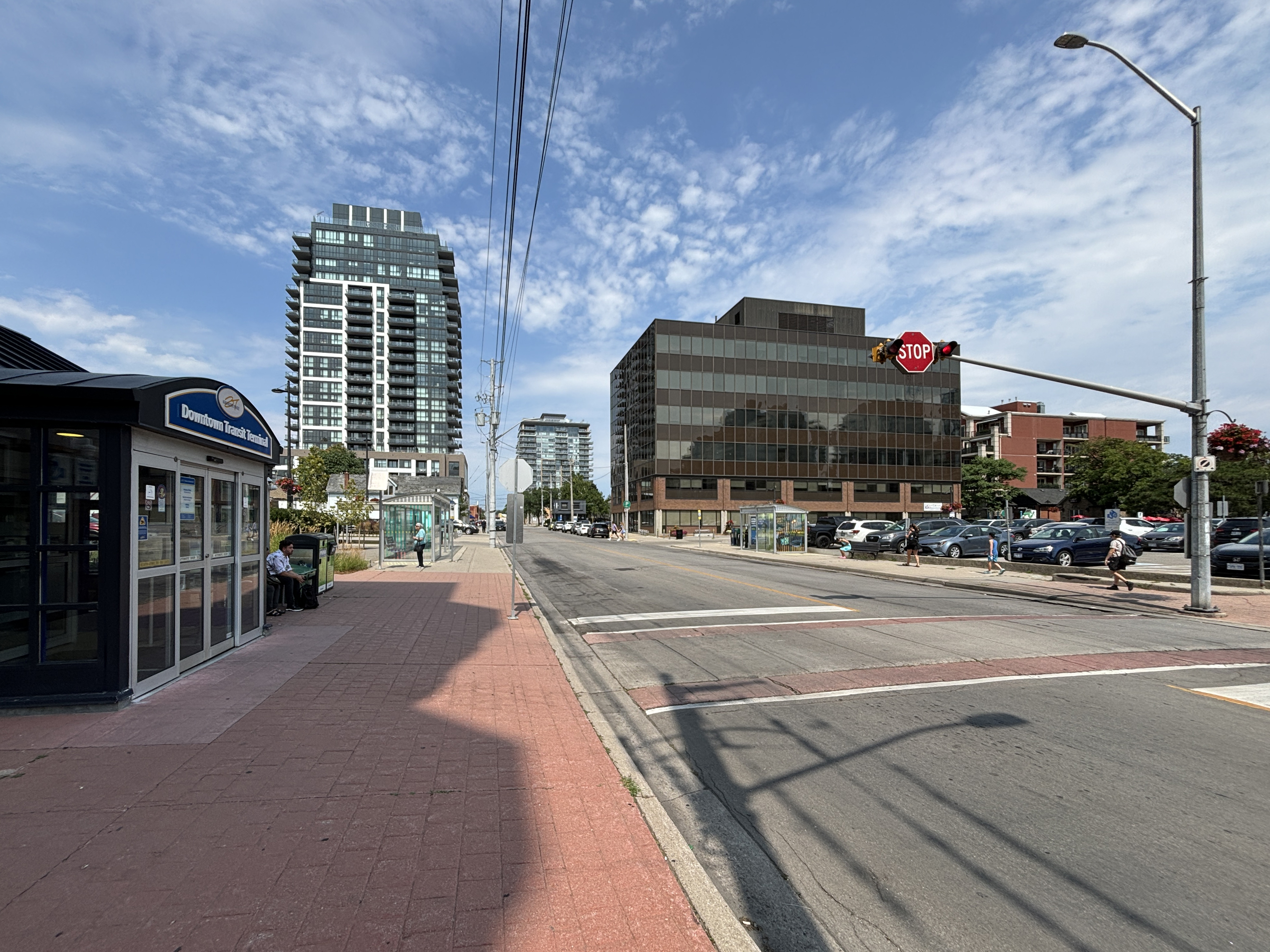

General information
- Other names: John Street Terminal
- Location: 430 John St, Burlington
- Coordinates: 43°19′32.5″N 79°47′48″W
- Bus stands: 6
- Bus operators: Burlington Transit; Hamilton Street Railway

Construction
- Parking: Paid municipal lot
- Accessible: Yes

History
- Opened: 1987
- Closed: April 12, 2025
Location

The Downtown Transit Terminal (also called the John Street Terminal) is located in downtown Burlington on John Street, just north of Pine Street, and south of James Street. The terminal is an on-street facility with northbound and southbound curbside bus bays and a customer service building on the west side of the street, next to the westbound and southbound shelters. The terminal is an important central transfer location for Burlington Transit and a terminus for Hamilton Street Railway services.

On April 12, 2025, customer service operations at the Downtown Transit Terminal were decommissioned and relocated to Burlington GO Station, located at 2101 Fairview Street.

== Photographs of vehicles ==
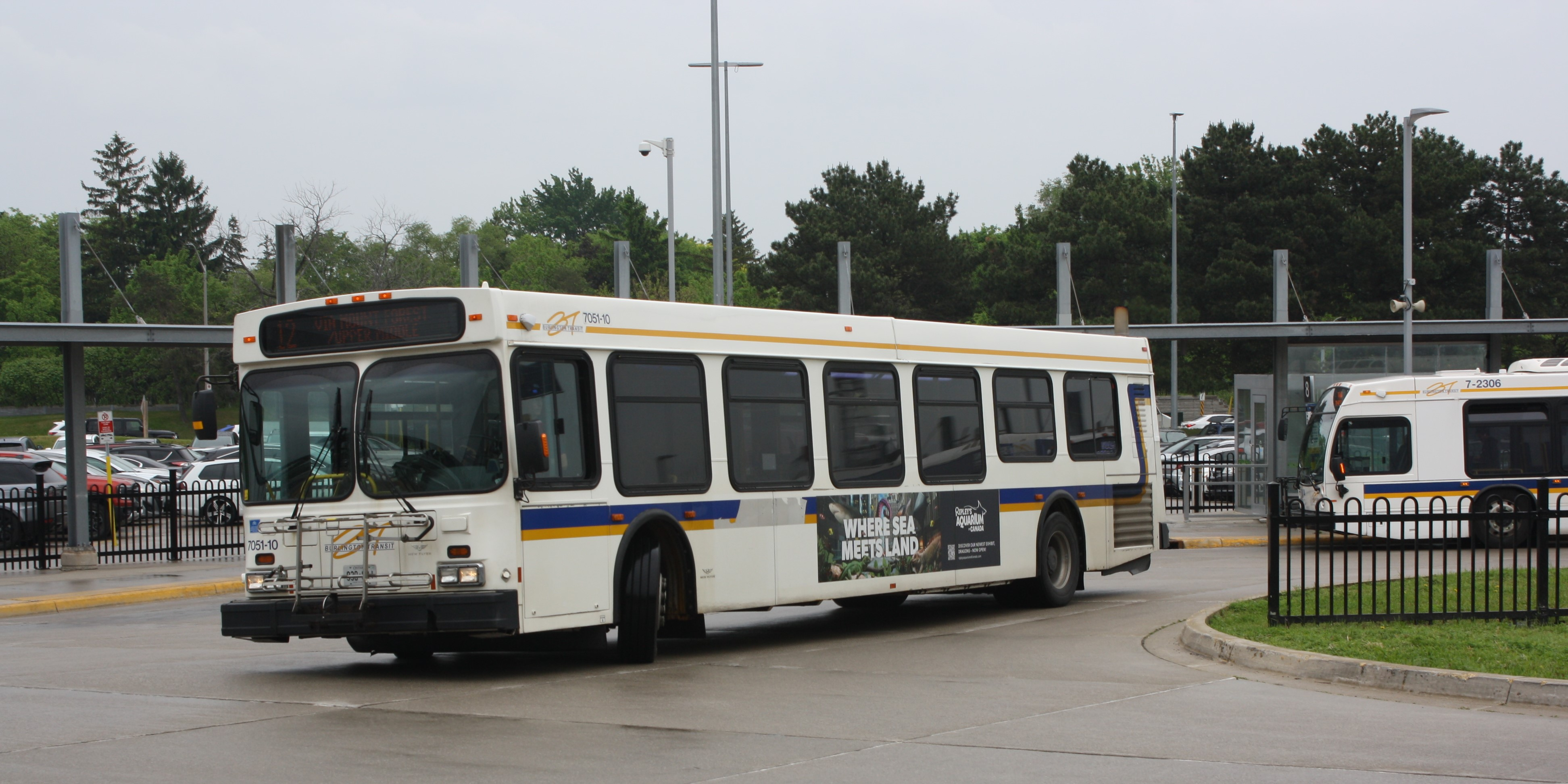
Burlington Transit's Oldest Bus (as of 10/15/25), 2010 New Flyer D40LF #7051-10 is seen departing the Burlington GO Station

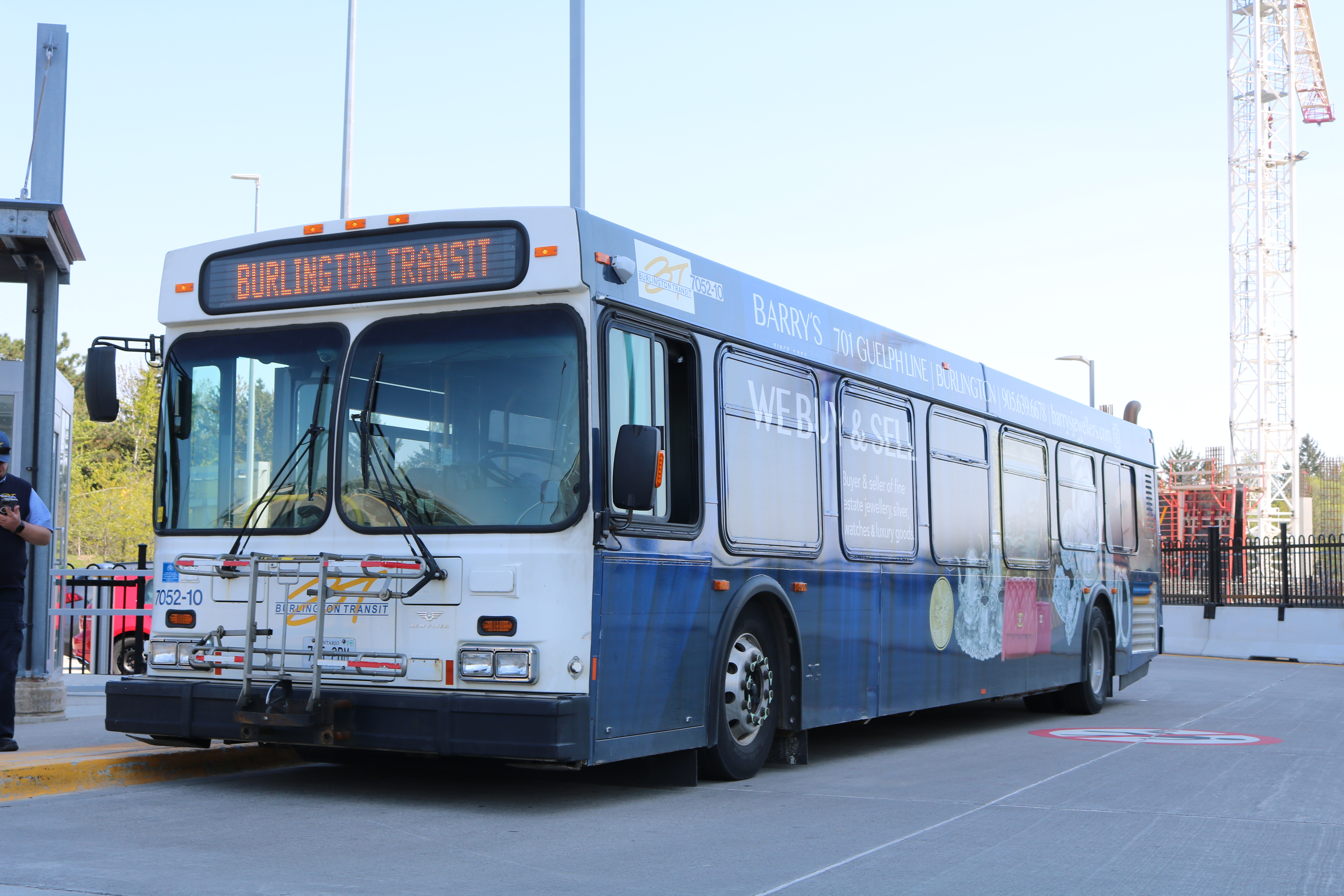
Burlington Transit 2010 New Flyer D40LF 7052-10 sits at the Burlington GO Station on route 12 Upper Middle

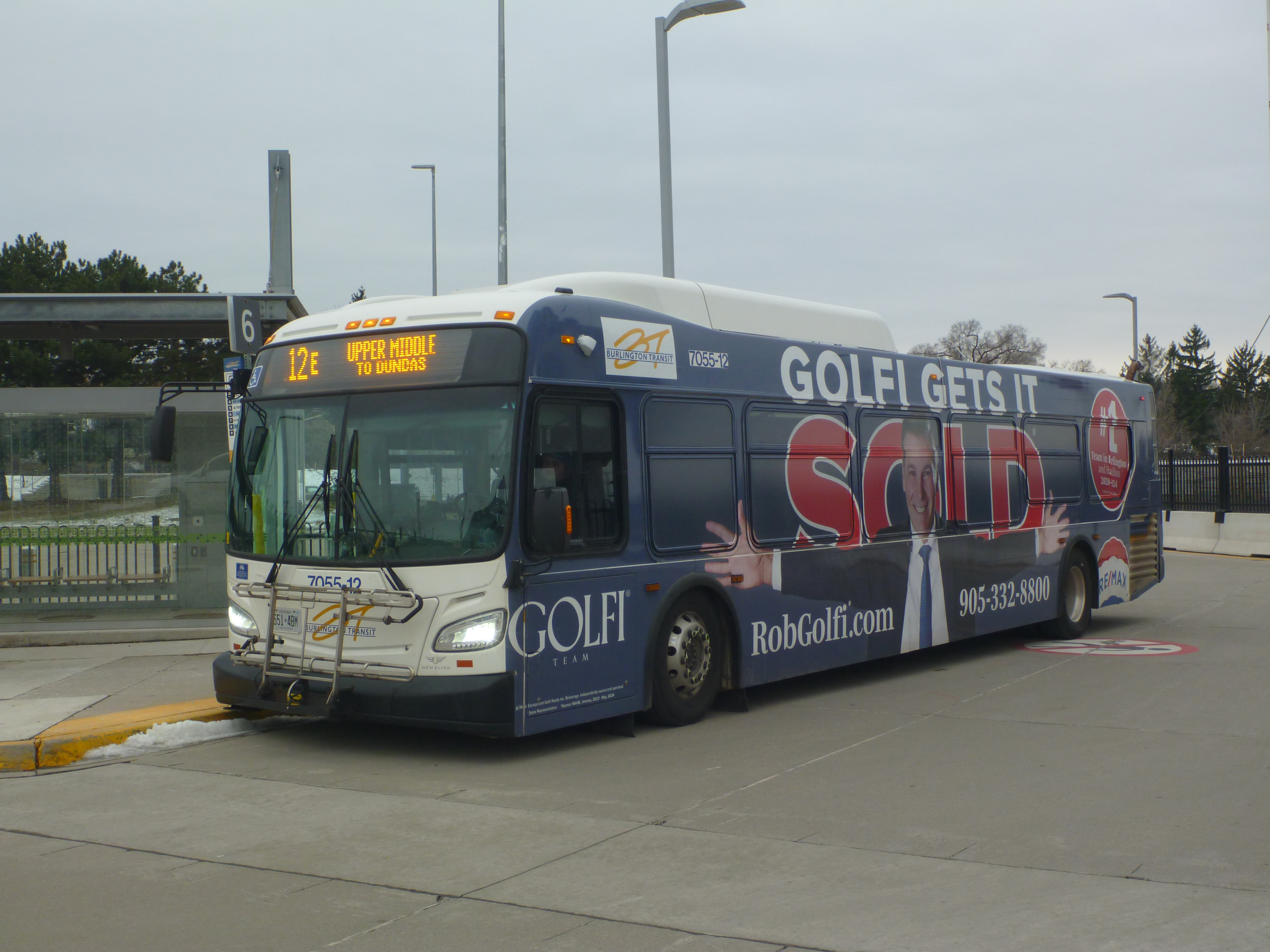
Burlington Transit 2012 New Flyer Xcelsior (XD40) #7055-12 rests at the Burlington GO

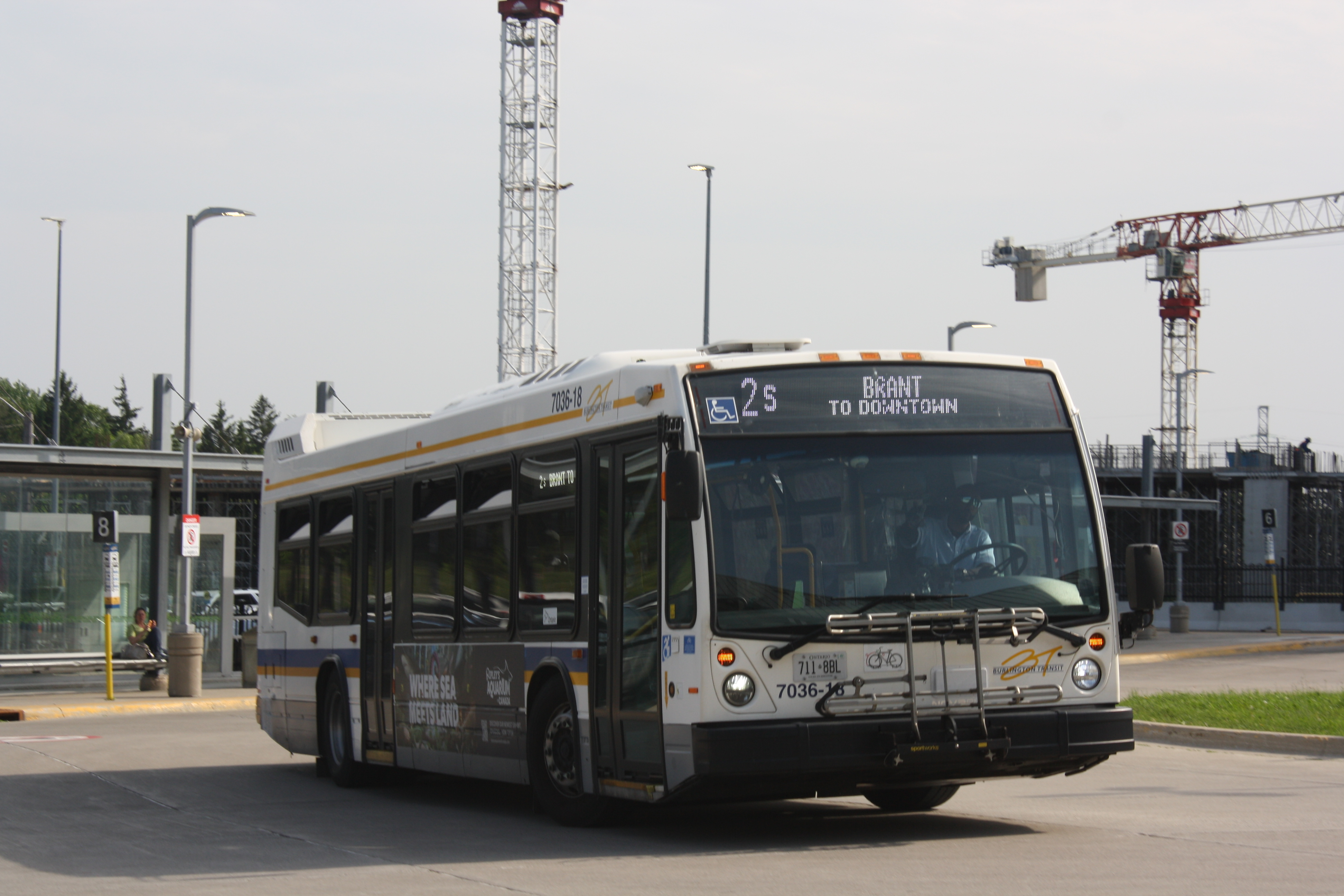
Burlington Transit 2018 NovaBus LFS 7036-18 departs the Burlington GO whilst on route 2

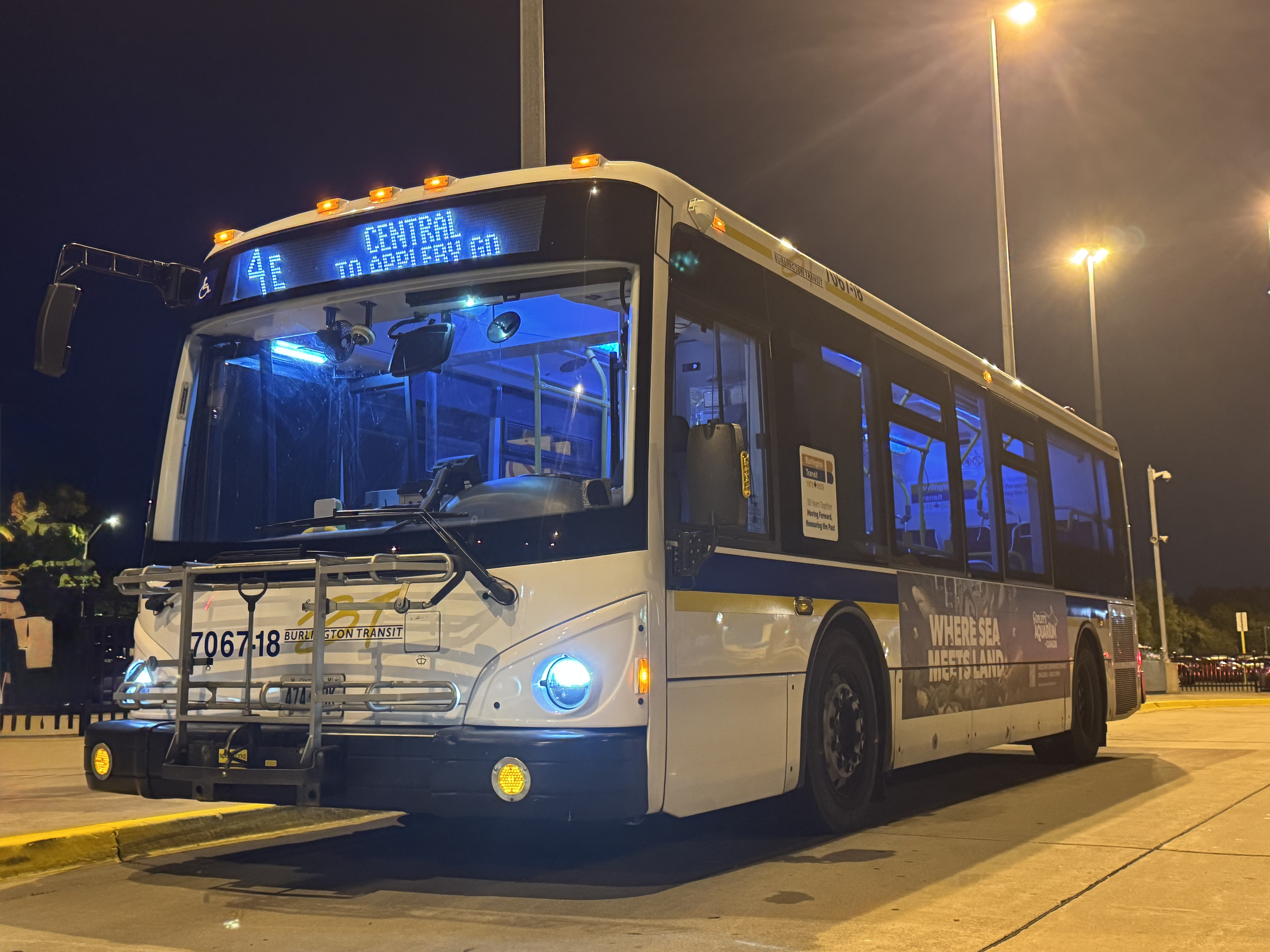
Burlington Transit 2018 Grande West Vicinity #7067-18 on route 4 Central at Aldershot GO

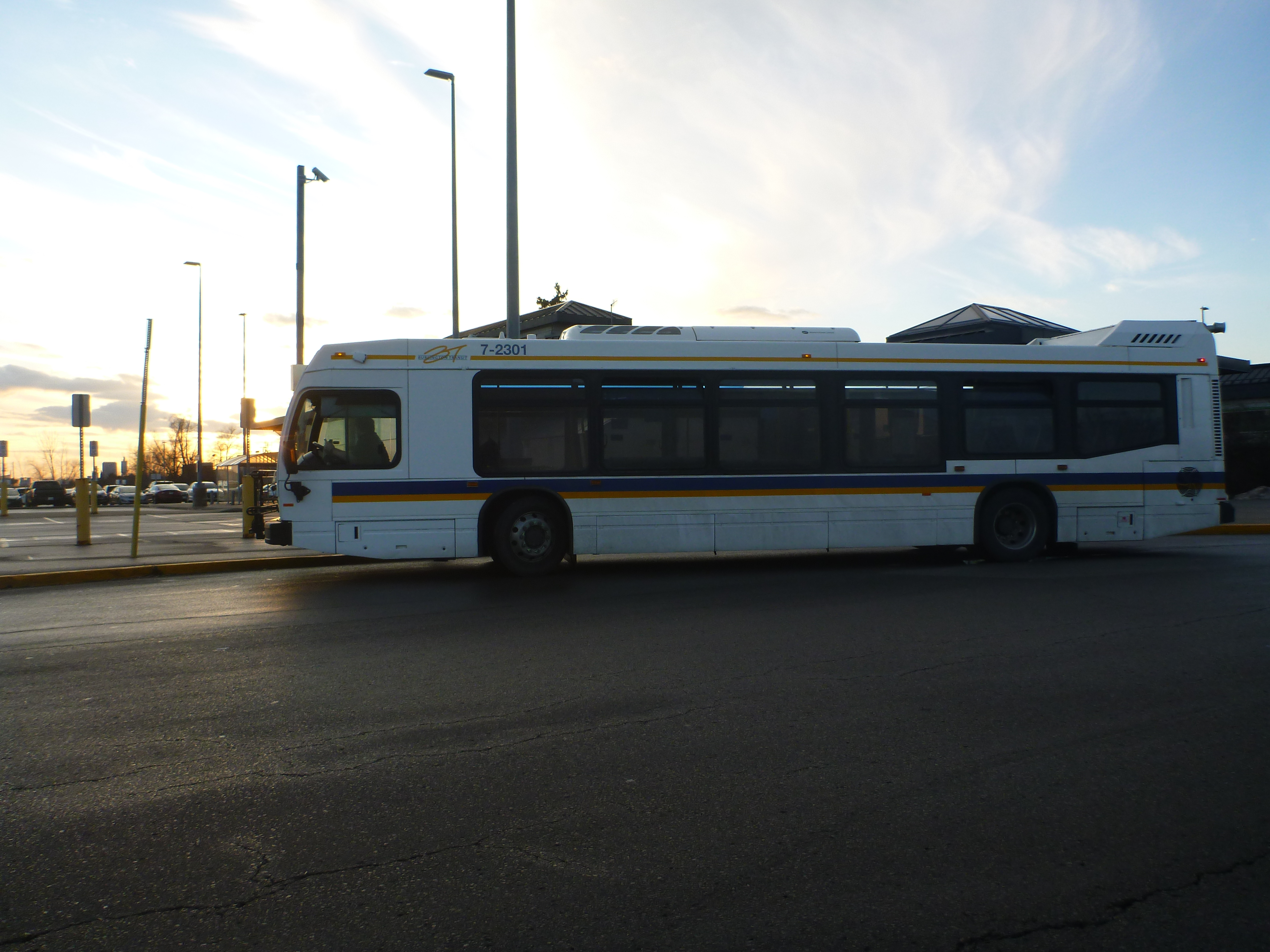
Burlington Transit 2023 NovaBus LFS #7-2301 at Appleby GO on route 1 Plains-Fairview

== See also ==
- List of public transit authorities in Canada
