= York Club =

Private club in Toronto, Ontario, Canada

Coordinates: 43°40′04″N 79°23′58″W

The York Club
- Founded: 22 November 1909
- Type: Private members' club
- Location(s): 135 St. George Street Toronto, Ontario, Canada
- Website: theyorkclub.org

The York Club is a private members' club that was incorporated on November 22, 1909. It is located at 135 St. George Street in The Annex neighbourhood of central Toronto, Ontario, close to the University of Toronto's St. George campus. The club's name refers to the town of York in Upper Canada, which became the city of Toronto in 1834.

== Clubhouse ==
The club's building was originally constructed between 1889 and 1892 as a residence for businessman George Gooderham Sr. (1830–1905) and his large family. Gooderham was a son of William Gooderham (1790–1881) and served as president of the Gooderham and Worts distillery. The house was designed in the Romanesque Revival style by architect David Roberts Jr., who also designed the Gooderham Building downtown.

After Gooderham died in May 1905, at the age of 75, his widow Harriet Gooderham (née Dean) sold the house and moved to a smaller home nearby at 224 St. George Street. The York Club has owned the building since 1910.

== Membership ==
The York Club was originally founded as a gentlemen's club, but in 1992, the club's membership voted overwhelmingly in favour of admitting women to full membership. The initial class of female members numbered five accomplished candidates, and the club rapidly introduced them onto its committees and Board of Directors. Six years after that initial decision, the Toronto Ladies' Club (founded in 1904) amalgamated with The York Club, further strengthening the latter's female membership.

== Leadership ==
=== Chairman of the Board ===
- 1909–20 – Sir Edmund Boyd Osler
- 1921–23 – Sir Byron Edmund Walker
- 1924–28 – William Cornelius Masten
- 1929–30 – Dr William Goldie
- 1931–32 – Dr Frederic Newton Gisborne Starr
- 1933 – Campbell Reaves
- 1934 – A. D. Walker
- 1935–37 – John Andrew McLeod
- 1938–39 – Dr David Edwin Robertson
- 1940 – James Bruce Mackinnon
- 1941 – Charles McCrea
- 1942–43 – Norman Currie Urquhart
- 1944 – Dr John Gordon Gallie
- 1945 – Hugh Lachlan Allward
- 1946 – Burnham Lord Mitchell
- 1947 – Dr Herbert Knudsen Detweiler
- 1948–50 – George Thomas Pepall
- 1951 – John Grant Glassco
- 1952 – John William McKee
- 1953 – Beverley Matthews
- 1954 – Lt-Col William Alfred Hawley MacBrien
- 1955 – John Rigsby White
- 1956 – John William McKee
- 1957 – Robert Alexander Laidlaw
- 1958 – John Grant Glassco
- 1959 – Lt-Col William Alfred Hawley MacBrien
- 1960 – Brig Frederic Campbell Wallace
- 1961 – John William McKee
- 1962 – John Grant Glassco
- 1963 – John Maitland Macintosh
- 1964 – John Girdlestone Hungerford
- 1965 – Ian Douglas Davidson
- 1966 – John Ross Bradfield
- 1967 – Britton Bath Osler
- 1968 – John Girdlestone Hungerford
- 1969 – Clifford Gooderham Beatty
- 1970 – Ian Douglas Davidson
- 1971 – Charles Percival Fell
- 1972 – John Ross Bradfield
- 1973 – Brig Ian Strachan Johnston
- 1974 – John Williamson Hamilton
- 1975 – Brig Gordon Doward de Salaberry Wotherspoon
- 1976 – Lt-Col G. Allan Burton
- 1977 – James Ian Crookston
- 1978 – Jeffery Page Rein Wadsworth
- 1979 – John Girdlestone Hungerford
- 1980 – St. Clair Balfour
- 1981 – William Price Wilder
- 1982 – Brig Gordon Doward de Salaberry Wotherspoon
- 1983 – George Campbell Hendrie
- 1984 – Dr Alfred Wells Farmer
- 1985–86 – James Ian Crookston
- 1987 – John Wallace Eaton
- 1988 – Jeffery Page Rein Wadsworth
- 1989 – Dr Grant Angus Farrow
- 1990 – Alexander Ross Aird
- 1991 – Fraser Matthews Fell
- 1992 – Grant Louis Reuber
- 1993 – Anthony Aallen van Straubenzee
- 1994 – Hedley Edmund Herbert Roy
- 1995 – Alan Joseph Dilworth
- 1996–97 – Dr Albert William Peter van Nostrand
- 1998–99 – N. Franklin Potter
- 2000–01 – John M. Stewart
- 2002–03 – Adam Hartley Zimmerman
- 2004–05 – Lt-Col John Gerard Brackenridge Strathy
- 2006–07 – William Thomas Brock
- 2008–09 – H. Garfield Emerson

=== President ===
- 1929–30 – Arthur Cornelius Masten
- 1931–32 – Sir William Thomas White
- 1933–34 – Sir John Aird
- 1935–36 – The Rev. Henry John Cody
- 1937–38 – Dr Alexander Primrose
- 1939–40 – Dr Herbert Alexander Bruce
- 1941–42 – Dr David Edwin Robertson
- 1943–44 – Herbert Deschamps Burns
- 1945–46 – Dr William Edward Gallie
- 1947–48 – James Young Murdoch
- 1949–50 – Gordon Foxbar Perry
- 1951–52 – George Thomas Pepall
- 1953–54 – John Grant Glassco
- 1955–56 – Lt-Col William Alfred Hawley MacBrien
- 1957–58 – John William McKee
- 1959–60 – Robert Alexander Laidlaw
- 1961–62 – Brig Frederic Campbell Wallace
- 1963–64 – Lt-Col Dr Melville Clarence Watson
- 1965–66 – John Maitland Macintosh
- 1967–68 – Beverley Matthews
- 1969–70 – John Girdlestone Hungerford
- 1971–72 – Ian Douglas Davidson
- 1973–74 – Britton Bath Osler
- 1975–76 – Charles Percival Fell
- 1977–78 – Dr Alfred Wells Farmer
- 1979–80 – James Ian Crookston
- 1981–82 – Brig Ian Strachan Johnston
- 1983–84 – St. Clair Balfour
- 1985–86 – George C. Hendrie
- 1987–88 – John Williamson Hamilton
- 1989–90 – Jeffery Page Rein Wadsworth
- 1991–92 – Lt-Col G. Allan Burton
- 1993–94 – William Price Wilder
- 1995–96 – Fraser Matthews Fell
- 1997–80 – Ralph MacKenzie Barford
- 1999–02 – John Napier Wyndham Turner
- 2003–04 – Henry Newton Rowell Jackman
- 2005–06 – Grant Louis Reuber
- 2007–08 – Anthony Allen van Straubenzee
- 2009 – John M. Stewart

== Gallery ==
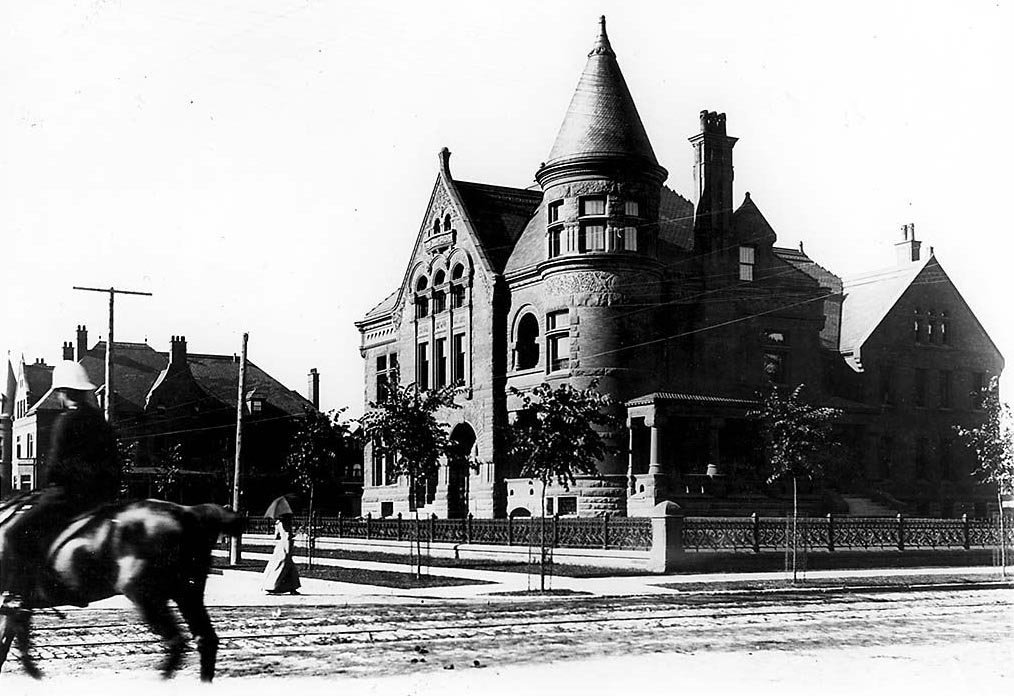

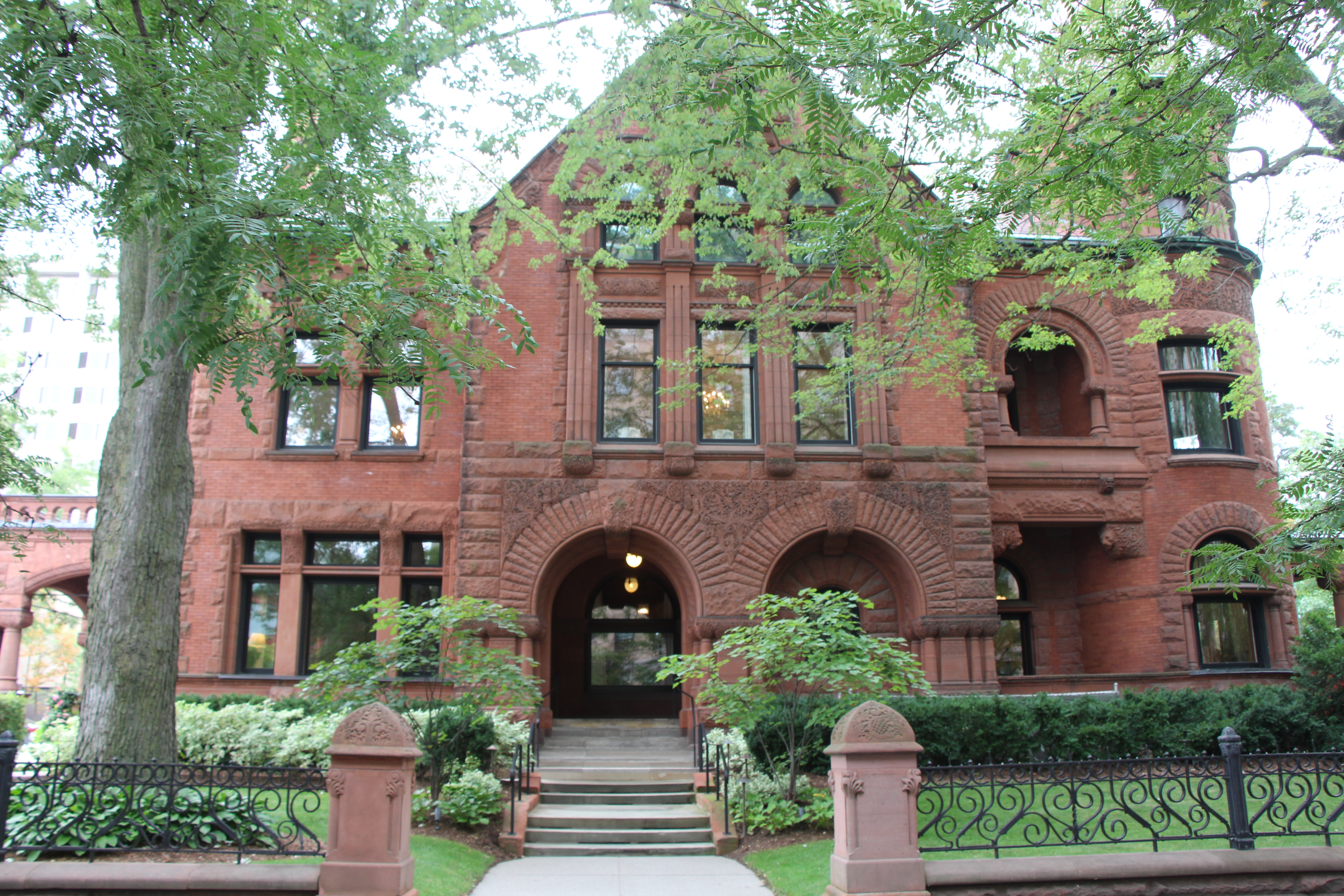

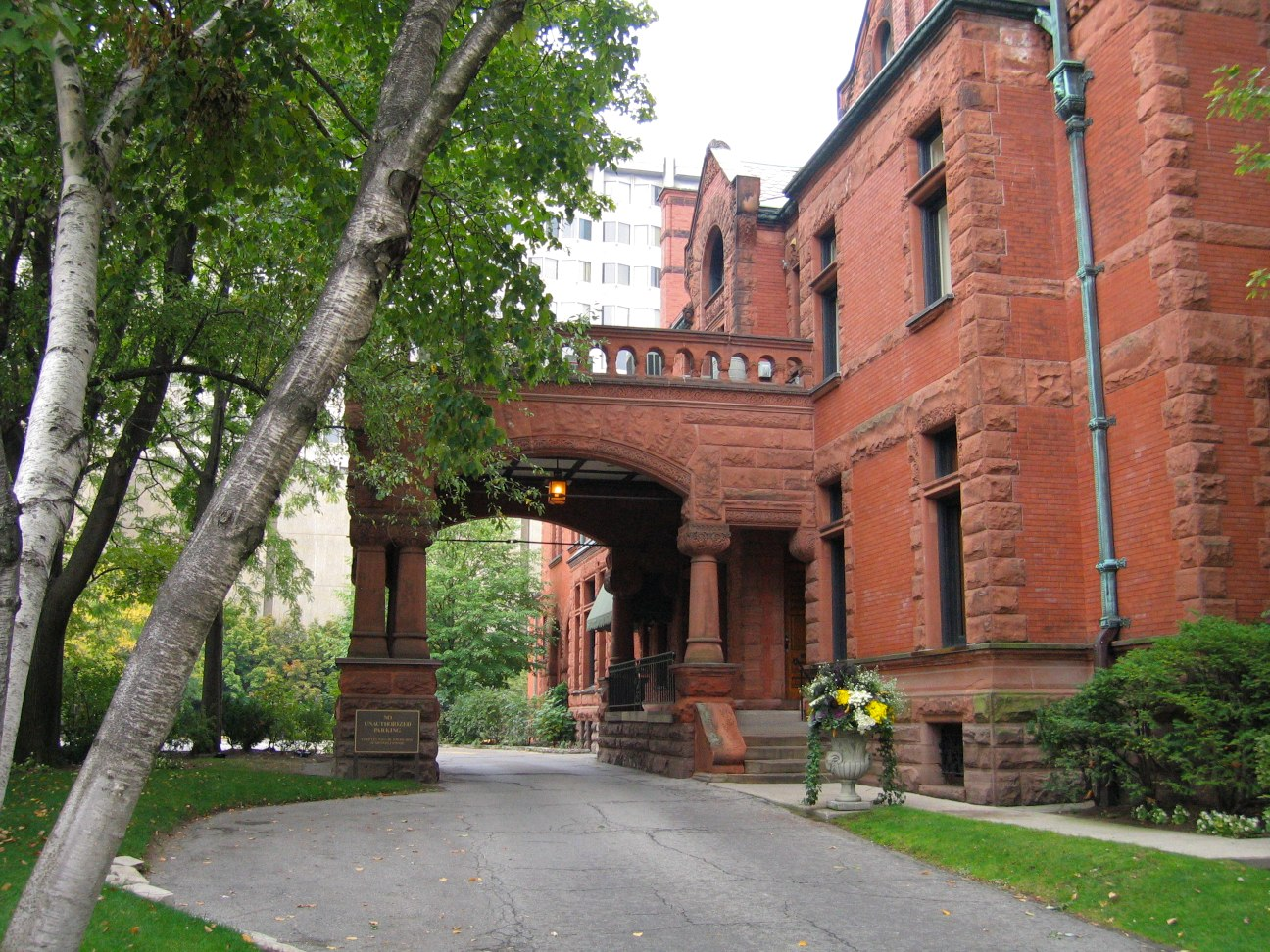
