= Mayflower Mall =

Shopping centre in Nova Scotia, Canada

- Coordinates: 46°8′47.9″N 60°8′15.8″W
- Address: 800 Grand Lake Road; Sydney, Nova Scotia, Canada; B1P 6S9
- Opened: 1980
- Num. of stores: 75
- Num. of anchor tenants: 6
- Floor area: 416,327 sq ft (38,678.0 m^{2})
- Floors: 1
- Website: mayflowermall.com

Mayflower Mall is a single level shopping mall in Sydney, Nova Scotia, Canada. It is the only regional mall in the Cape Breton Regional Municipality of Nova Scotia; it is also the main fashion shopping destination in the community. The mall features a diverse anchor mix including Best Buy, Winners, Sport Chek, Michaels, Staples.

== History ==
The mall opened in August 1980 with Hudson's Bay, Dominion, and Woolco as original anchor stores.

In February 1983, Hudson's Bay was converted to Simpsons, another department store chain owned by the Hudsons Bay Company (HBC). In the 1982, HBC annual report, it outlines the reason for conversion is Simpsons had better market recognition than The Bay (Hudson's Bay) in this part of the country. Simpsons was converted back to Hudson's Bay along with the stores in Halifax and Dartmouth by July 1986.

During the early 1990s, a stand-alone Sobeys store was opened next to Woolco. In March 1994 Walmart bought 122 Woolco stores from Woolworth Canada in which the Mayflower Mall location was converted to Walmart. In the mid-2000s, Walmart moved across the street to a new big box power centre development also owned by the mall.

On May 5, 2010, Sobeys closed the Mayflower mall location affecting 63 employees. Around this time Mayflower Mall had been renovated with a new food court with the former Sobeys and Walmart spaces being redeveloped into several new retailers.

Walmart was redeveloped into Winners, Sport Chek, East Side Mario's, and Future Shop

Sobeys was redeveloped into Michaels, Mark's, and Pets Unlimited.

In 2015, Future Shop closed and was converted to Best Buy.

Urban Planet closed in 2020 with Old Navy moving into the space previously occupied by Urban Planet.

Dollarama opened in 2020.

In 2022, Best Buy moved into a new space previously occupied by Mappins.

Spring 2023 TJX opened a new HomeSense location in Best Buy's former space within Winners creating a hybrid banner location.

== Major Anchor Stores/Restaurants ==
- Winners/HomeSense - Opened In 2006 (Winners), 2023 (HomeSense)
- Michaels - Opened In 2007 (Free Standing)
- East Side Marios - Opened In 2005
- Mark's - Opened In 2007 (Free Standing)
- Staples - Opened In 2004
- Dollarama - Opened In 2020
- Tim Hortons - Opened In 2007
- A&W - Opened In 2007
- Subway - Opened In 2002
- Old Navy - Opened In 2020
- Sport Chek - Opened In 2008
- Best Buy - Opened In 2016
- Reitmans - Opened In 2004
- PetValu - Opened In 2008 (Free Standing) (Originally Pets Unlimited Until 2015)
- La Vie En Rose - Opened In 2019

== Former Major Stores/Restaurants ==
- Dominion - Closed in 1985 with Dominion selling its Nova Scotia locations to the Oshawa Group; converted to other retailers.
- Future Shop - Converted to Best Buy. The chain was owned by Best Buy which closed or converted all Future Shop locations in Canada.
- Hudson's Bay - Opened in 1980 at 82,944 Sq. ft. Converted to Simpsons in 1983. Converted back to Hudson's Bay in 1986 by HBC. Closed in 2025 and currently vacant.
- Simpsons - Converted back to Hudson's Bay in July 1986. This being a rare exception in which a store reverts to its original banner.
- Sobeys - Closed May 5, 2010. This location retained an older store design never having a major renovation. Sobeys decided to close the Mayflower Mall location due to having locations nearby in Sydney River and at the Sydney Shopping Centre..
- Urban Planet - Closed in 2020 with Old Navy opening its first location on the island.
- Walmart - Closed in 2005 - Relocated to power centre development also owned by Mayflower Mall.
- Woolco - Converted to Walmart in 1994 with Walmart purchasing 122 Woolco stores from Woolworth's Canada.

== See also ==
- List of largest enclosed shopping malls in Canada
- List of shopping malls in Canada
