= Betty Kennedy =

Canadian politician

The Honourable Betty Kennedy OC

Canadian Senator from Ontario
- In office June 20, 2000 – January 4, 2001
- Appointed by: Jean Chrétien

Personal details
- Born: Betty Margaret Hannah Styran; January 4, 1926 Ottawa, Ontario, Canada
- Died: March 20, 2017 (aged 91)
- Party: Liberal
- Spouses: Gerhard Kennedy (m. 1948; died 1975) G. Allan Burton (m. 1976; died 2002)
- Children: 4
- Occupation: Author; broadcaster; journalist

Betty Margaret Hannah Kennedy OC (née Styran; January 4, 1926 – March 20, 2017) was a Canadian broadcaster, journalist, author, and Senator. She is best known for her work on radio and television.

== Biography ==
Born and raised in Ottawa, Ontario, the daughter of Walter Herbert Styran and Janet Kincaid (McPhee) Styran, Kennedy graduated from Lisgar Collegiate Institute, and began her career with the Ottawa Citizen. She became a broadcaster, as a host of a local radio show, during a newspaper strike. She was soon hired away by CFRB in Toronto where she became host of The Betty Kennedy Show in 1959; the daily interview and public affairs show remained on the air for 27 years with Kennedy interviewing 25,000 guests ranging from Pierre Trudeau to Debbie Reynolds. In 1962, she joined the panel of the current affairs quiz show Front Page Challenge on CBC Television, remaining with the show until it went off the air in 1995.

She wrote two books: Gerhard: A love story (1975), about her late first husband, and Hurricane Hazel (1979). Kennedy also had a vital career as an Executive Producer for television. Her series, Insight with Betty Kennedy, aired on TV Ontario (OECA) during the early 1970s. Robert Gardner, who worked with Kennedy as a studio director on the series, said of her: "She was remarkable. We would tape five half hour interviews live-to-tape in a single day. She would prep each of the sessions with very prominent guests and would flawlessly interview them. Often there was only a space of fifteen minutes between each program. There were no re-takes and not a single chance for error." She also executive-produced Leave this Not to Cain (narrated by Pierre Berton), This Vibrant Land, and she hosted An Eye for Eternity (the international fine arts exhibition at Montreal).

Kennedy's first husband, businessman Gerhard Kennedy, died of cancer in 1975. Her second husband was G. Allan Burton (1915–2002), CEO and chairman of now defunct Simpsons department stores.

She was appointed to the Senate by Prime Minister Jean Chrétien on June 20, 2000. She retired less than six months later on her 75th birthday.

Kennedy resided in Campbellville, Ontario, near Milton, Ontario with Burton.

Kennedy died on March 20, 2017, aged 91.

Kennedy was named to both the Canadian Broadcast Hall of Fame and the Canadian News Hall of Fame and was made an Officer of the Order of Canada in 1982.

== Honours ==
- In 1982 she was made an Officer of the Order of Canada.
- In 1983, she was elected to the Canadian News Hall of Fame.
- In 1992, she was elected to the Canadian Broadcasting Hall of Fame.
- In 1998, she was made a Serving Sister in the Venerable Order of Saint John.
- In 2007, she was inducted into the Milton, Ontario Walk of Fame
