= Appleby GO Station =

Railway station in Burlington, Ontario, Canada

Appleby
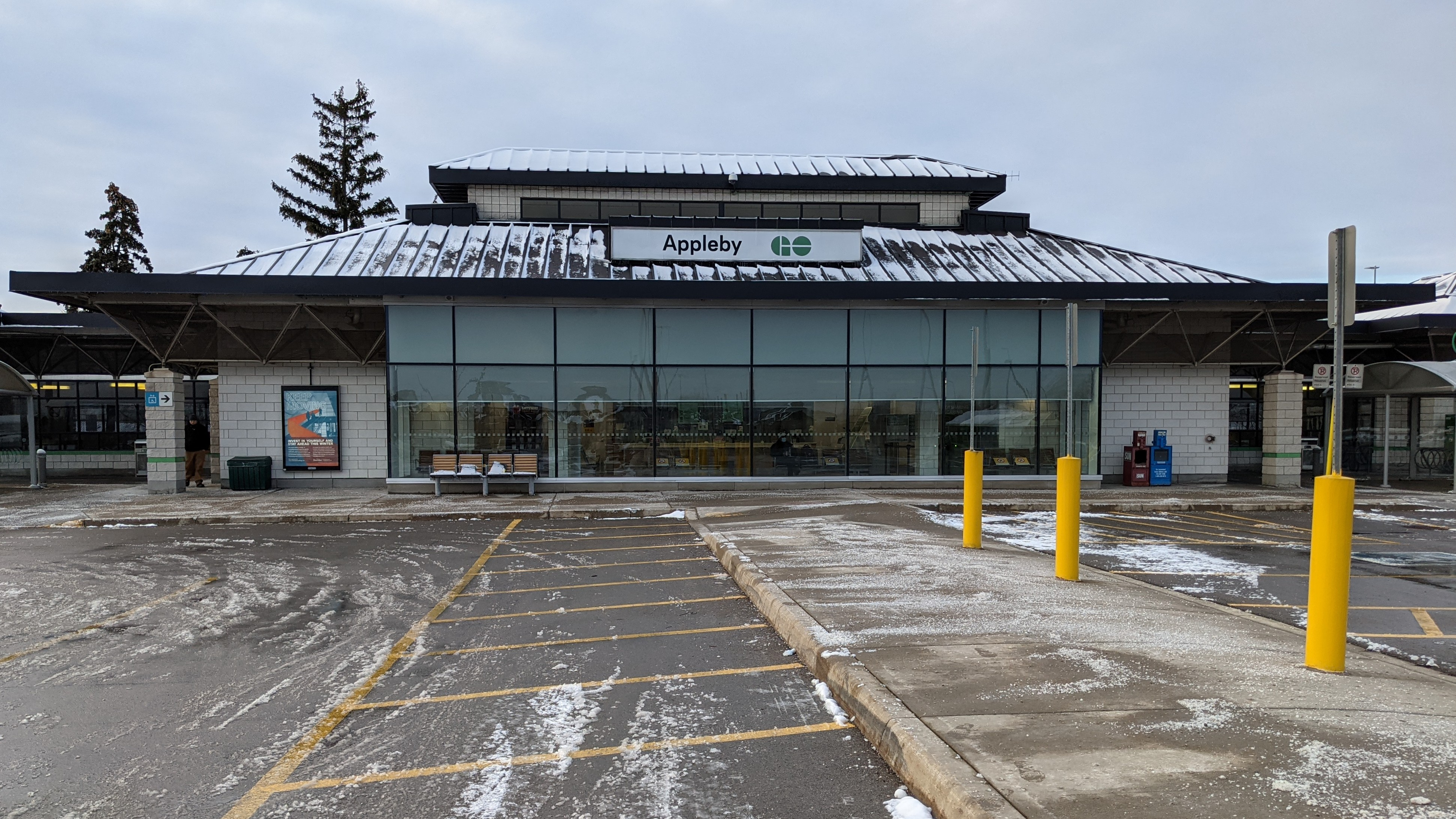

General information
- Location: 5111 Fairview Street; Burlington, Ontario; Canada
- Coordinates: 43°22′45″N 79°45′41″W
- Owner: Metrolinx
- Platforms: 1 island platform, 1 side platform
- Tracks: 3
- Bus routes: 18
- Connections: Burlington Transit; Oakville Transit

Construction
- Structure type: Station building
- Parking: 1,217 north lot 1,205 south lot 2,422 Total spaces
- Cycle facilities: Racks

Other information
- Station code: GO Transit: AP
- Fare zone: 15

History
- Opened: September 19, 1988; 38 years ago
- Electrified: September 2035; 8 years' time (planned)

Services
Preceding station	GO Transit	Following station
Burlington towards Confederation	Lakeshore West	Bronte towards Union
Burlington towards Hamilton or Niagara Falls	Lakeshore West (peak express)	Bronte towards Union
Location

Appleby GO Station is a railway station and bus station in the GO Transit network located in the 5000 block of Fairview Street in Burlington, Ontario in Canada near Appleby Line. It is a stop on the Lakeshore West line train service.

This station primarily serves residential areas in the eastern part of Burlington with train services on weekdays and weekends. There are connecting Burlington Transit and Oakville Transit local bus services.

Renovations began in the fall of 2014, incorporating repairs to the parking lots, relocation of the south drop-off area, the addition of energy efficient lighting and reconstruction of the south bus loop.

== Burlington Transit connecting service ==
- 1 Plains-Fairview
- 4 Central
- 10 New-Maple
- 11 Sutton-Alton
- 25 Walkers
- 80 Harvester
- 81 North Service (Peak Service only)

== Oakville Transit connecting service ==
- 14/14A Lakeshore West
