= Robert Simpson (merchant) =

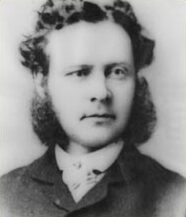
- Simpson in 1866, at age 32
- Born: September 17, 1834; Strathspey, Moray, Scotland
- Died: December 14, 1897 (aged 63); Toronto, Ontario, Canada
- Resting place: Mount Pleasant Cemetery, Toronto
- Education: grammar school
- Occupation(s): Draper, dry good store owner, retailer
- Years active: 1858-1897
- Employer(s): D. Sutherland & Sons, Newmarket
- Known for: Founder of Robert Simpson Company
- Spouse: Mary Anne Botsford
- Children: 1

Robert Simpson (September 17, 1834 – December 14, 1897) was the Scottish founder of Simpson's department store chain in Canada.

== Life ==
He was born in Strathspey, Moray, Scotland in 1834 to Peter Simpson and Jane Christie Parmouth. His father was a general store owner, and Simpson was trained in the drapery trade in Elgin, Moray before immigrating to Newmarket, Province of Canada, at the age of 21 where he worked at his uncle's dry goods store. Before long, Simpson started up his own store in Newmarket, Ontario as the Simpson & Trent Groceries, Boots, Shoes and Dry Goods (1858–1870) and later as the Robert Simpson Company from 1870 to 1871. Simpson and his family relocated to Toronto in 1871 and in 1872 he opened a pioneer department store in Toronto that eventually expanded into the major national chain, Simpson's.

For decades, Simpson's store was in a rivalry with fellow retailer Timothy Eaton on Yonge Street.

Simpson married Mary Anne Botsford and had one daughter, Margaret, who married the grandson of William Hamilton Merritt, William Hamilton Merritt III in 1890. The Merritts did not have any children, thus ending the Simpson lineage.

Robert Simpson died in 1897 and is buried in Mount Pleasant Cemetery, Toronto.

== Legacy ==
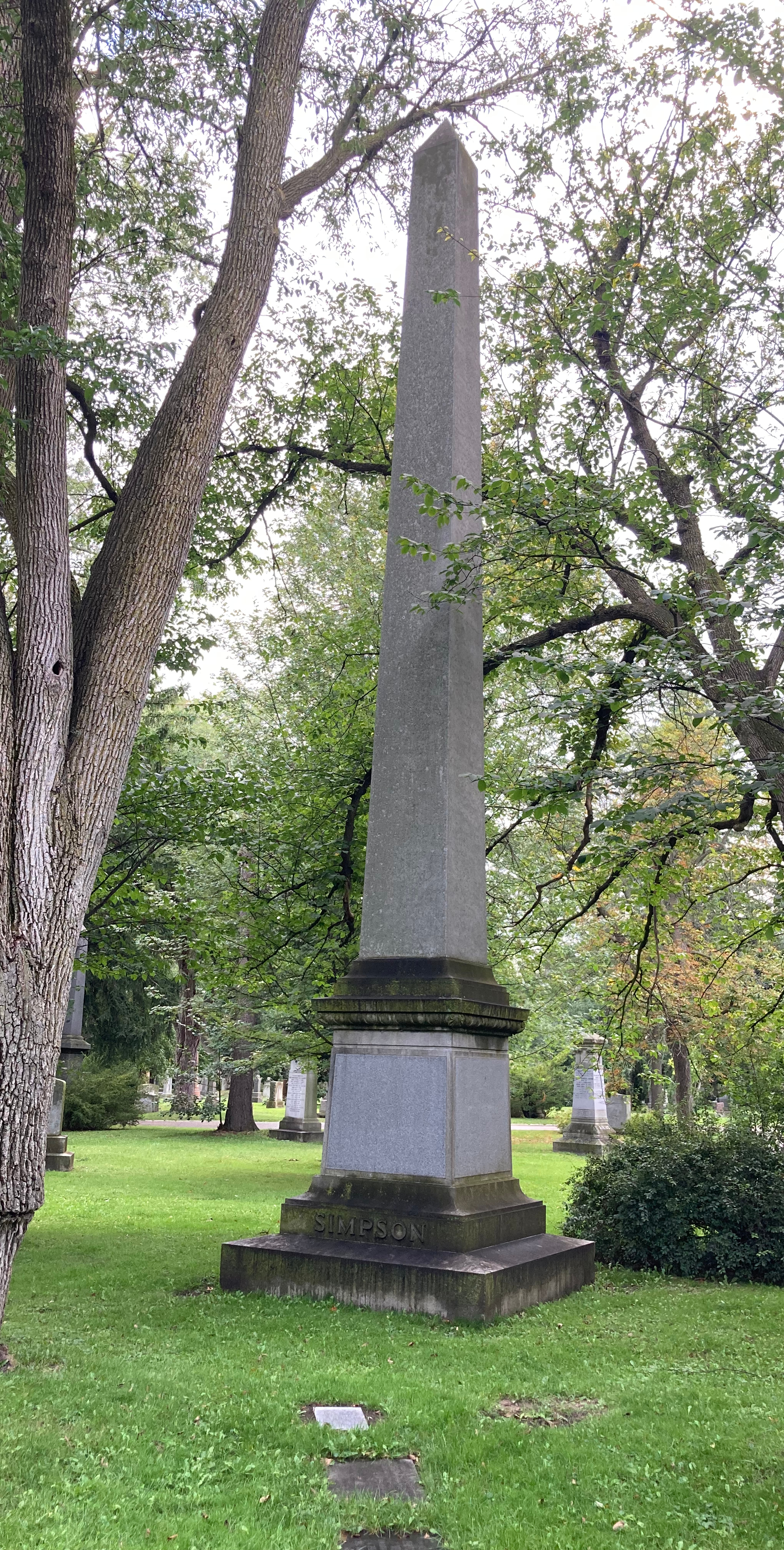
Simpson's grave at Mount Pleasant Cemetery

Margaret Simpson, daughter of Robert Simpson, married William Hamilton Merritt in 1890. She is buried with him at Mount Pleasant Cemetery, Toronto.

James Sutherland, his cousin, owned and operated a trading business from 1871 until his death in 1889.

His first store at Main and Timothy Streets in Newmarket is occupied by small retail buildings. As for the Toronto location at 184 Yonge Street, it was later rebuilt by Robert Jameison and later became the F. W. Woolworth Building.
