= Simpsons (department store) =

Canadian department store chain

The Robert Simpson Company Ltd.
- Type: Subsidiary
- Industry: Retail
- Predecessor: Simpson & Trent (1858–1870)
- Founded: 1872; 154 years ago (as R. Simpson, Dry Goods)
- Founder: Robert Simpson
- Defunct: August 14, 1991
- Fate: Converted to The Bay
- Successor: The Bay
- Headquarters: Toronto, Ontario, Canada
- Area served: Canada
- Products: Clothing, footwear, bedding, furniture, jewelry, beauty products, appliances, housewares, tools, and electronics
- Parent: Hudson's Bay Company (1979–1991)

The Robert Simpson Company Limited, commonly known as Simpson's between 1896 and 1972, then as Simpsons (up until 1991), and in Quebec occasionally as Simpson, was a Canadian department store chain that had its earliest roots in a store opened in 1858 by Robert Simpson.

In 1952, Simpson's started a 50–50 joint venture in Canada named Simpsons-Sears Limited (later Sears Canada) with Sears, Roebuck, the American retailer. Simpsons-Sears stores remained distinct from the Simpson's stores and the parent companies' agreement included language to keep them from competing too directly with each other.

The Hudson's Bay Company (HBC) purchased the Simpsons-branded stores in 1978, but they were later converted to The Bay stores by the early 1990s. As part of the 1978 agreement, American-based Sears acquired full ownership of Simpsons-Sears Limited.

== History ==
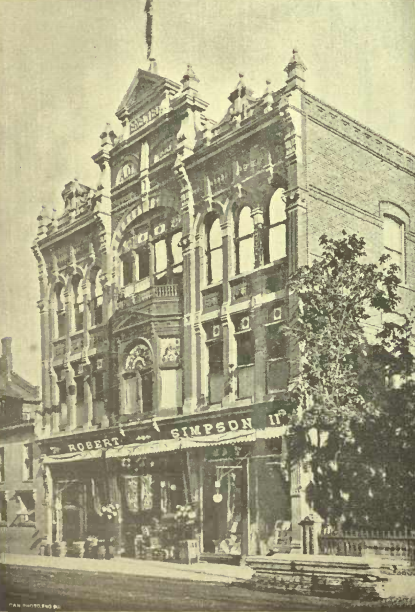
Robert Simpson's store in 1891

Robert Simpson's original store (Simpson & Bogart after 1861), was opened in 1858 in Newmarket, Ontario at what is now 226-228 Main Street South (original building since demolished). it was co-founded with William Trent as Simpson & Trent Groceries, Boots, Shoes and Dry Goods. A fire destroyed the store in 1870, and a new dry goods store was opened two years later in Toronto. Robert Simpson lived at 384 Botsford Street in Newmarket from 1861 to 1876.

The company was renamed the Robert Simpson Company Limited in May 1896, not long before Robert Simpson's sudden death on 14 December 1897, at the age of 63. With no male heir, Simpson's death placed a heavy burden on his wife, Mary, and daughter, Margaret. They sold the business for $135,000 in March 1898 to a syndicate of three Toronto businessmen, Harris Henry Fudger (1852–1930), Joseph Flavelle, and Alfred Ernest Ames (1866–1934).

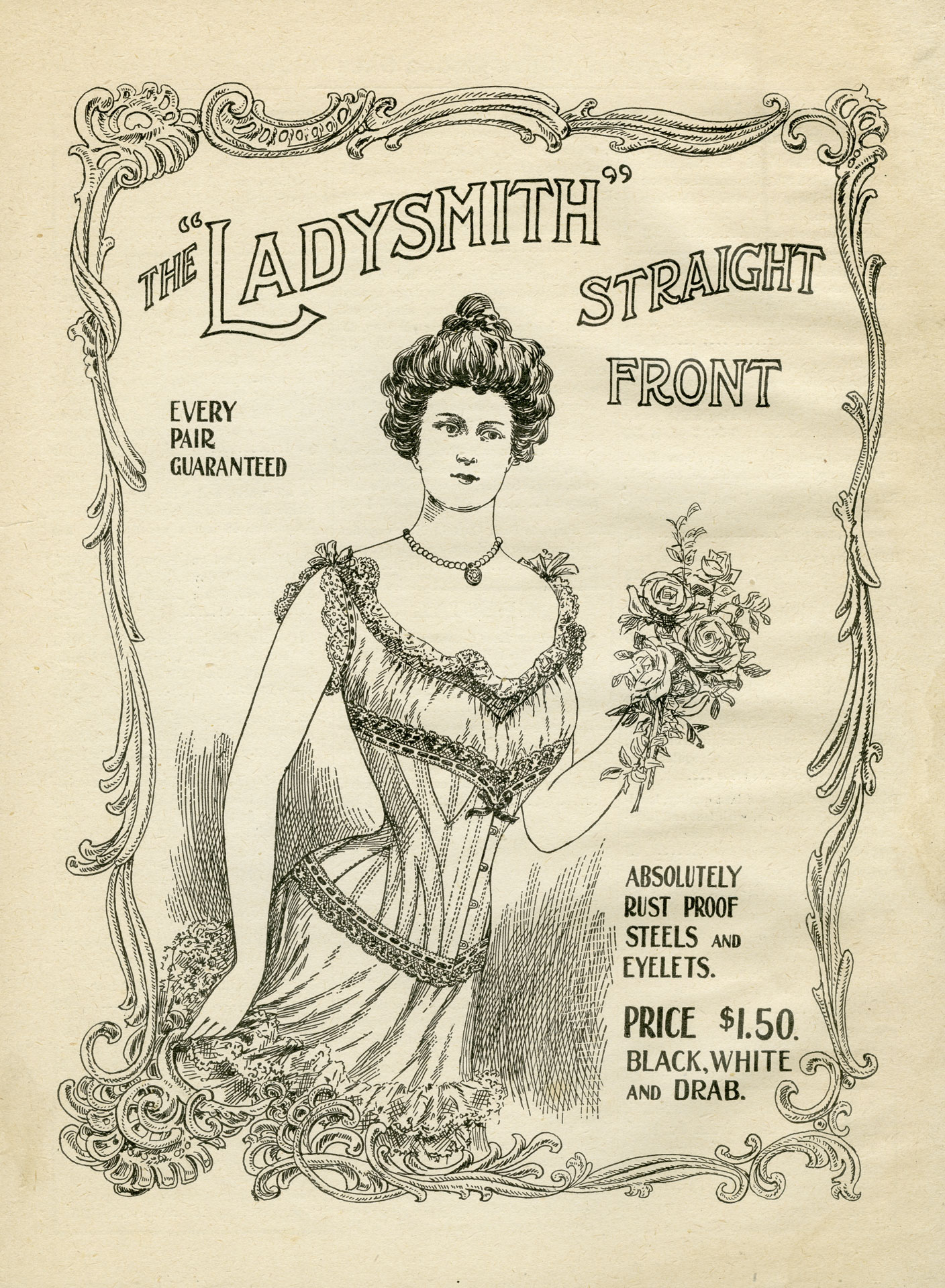
Page from the Robert Simpson Co. White Goods Catalogue, 1901

In 1912, Charles Luther (C.L.) Burton became assistant general manager at the Robert Simpson Company, then under the directorship of his old friend and mentor, H. H. Fudger. By 1929, Burton was president of Simpson's, becoming chairman of the board in 1948, when his son Edgar assumed the presidency.

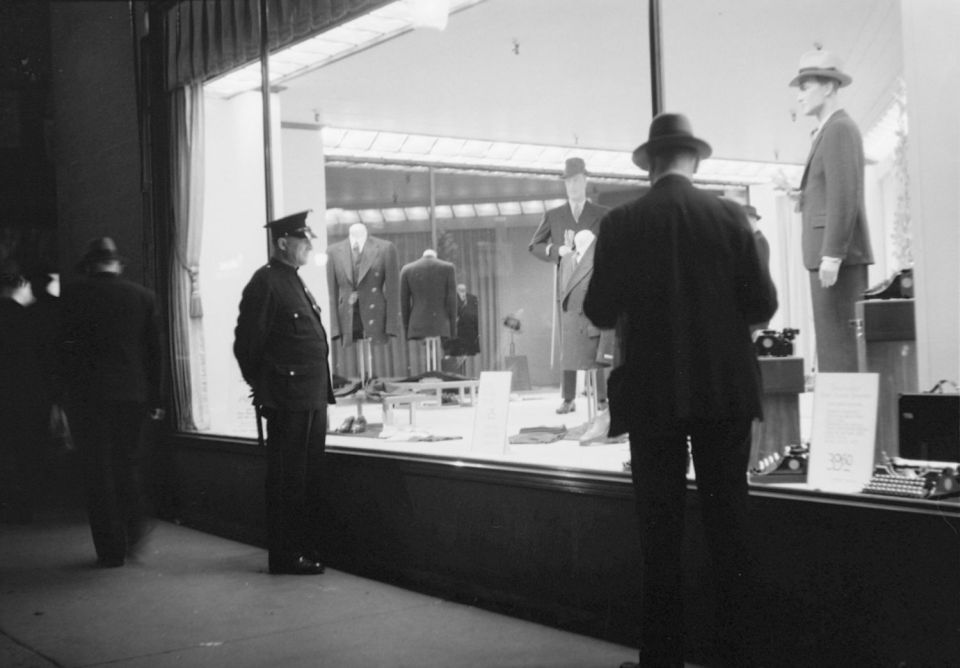
Menswear showcase of Simpson's store on St. Catherine Street in Montreal, 1936

The store in downtown Toronto included one of the city's most exclusive restaurants, the Arcadian Court, which opened in 1929 and still operates today (as an event space) after the store's acquisition by Hudson's Bay Company in 1978. Throughout its history, Simpsons was the traditional "carriage-trade" department store in Toronto, competing with the T. Eaton Company. The motto "You'll enjoy shopping at Simpson's" was conceived by Robert Simpson and remained the company's slogan until its acquisition by the Hudson's Bay Company.

Previous logo (changed in 1957)

=== Simpsons-Sears ===
Simpsons-Sears logo

In 1952, General Robert E. Wood, the Chairman of U.S. retailer Sears, Roebuck and Co., sent a letter to Edgar G. Burton, President of the Robert Simpson Company of Toronto, proposing a partnership between their two companies in order to serve the Canadian market. The deal to create Simpsons-Sears Limited, a Canadian catalogue and department store chain separate from the Simpsons chain, was signed on September 18, 1952, and the terms were 50-50. Each company put up $20 million and had equal representation on the new company's board of directors. The new company was to have two main objectives. The first was to expand Simpsons' existing mail-order business, which was sold to the new company. The second goal was to build a string of stores modelled on Sears, Roebuck's format right across the country.

The agreement also contained a provision that would prove to be a major bone of contention in the coming years. Under its terms, Simpsons-Sears could not open a retail store within 25 miles of Simpson's existing stores in Toronto, Montreal, Halifax, Regina and London. In return, Simpson's promised not to build any stores outside of those five cities. Simpsons-Sears mail-order business, however, was free to operate anywhere in Canada, and so was the new Simpsons-Sears Acceptance Company, the credit arm of the operation.

The business operations of Simpsons-Sears began when the first Simpsons-Sears Spring/Summer Catalogue rolled off the presses of Photo-Engravers and Electrotypers, Ltd. and were delivered to 300,000 Canadian homes in early 1953.

On Thursday, September 17, 1953, the first Simpsons-Sears retail store opened in Stratford, Ontario at 9:15 a.m. The second Simpsons-Sears store opened in Kamloops, B.C., in December of that year.

In the 1960s, Simpson's was among the first 10 Canadian companies to start using computers in all their locations, and programming was done in Toronto and Montreal by accounting clerks, many of whom were women. Enormous rooms with special ventilation were built to house IBM punch card mainframe machines in those two locations.

In 1972, Simpsons and Simpsons-Sears agreed to end the 25-mile restriction and permit Simpsons and Simpsons-Sears stores anywhere. To avoid confusion in the media, the company decided to now use the Sears name for its Simpsons-Sears stores although the equal ownership continued between Simpsons and Sears Roebuck.

=== Acquisition by the Hudson's Bay Company ===
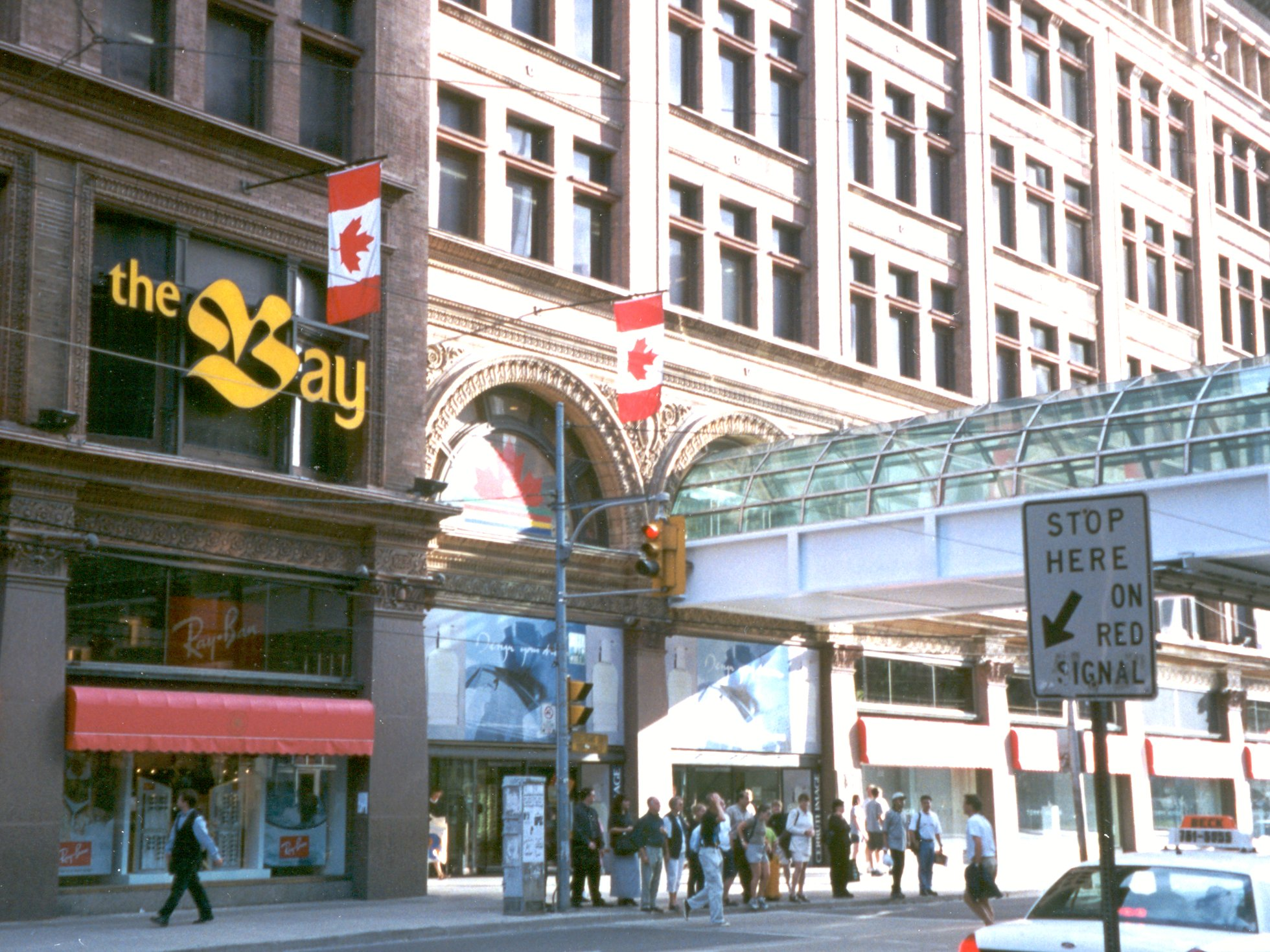
The Bay Queen Street, formerly Simpsons' flagship store in Toronto, later operated by The Bay.

In 1978, the Hudson's Bay Company acquired Simpsons and federal competition law required the partnership to terminate, thus Simpsons and Simpsons-Sears could no longer share facilities. Sears stores continued to carry the Simpsons-Sears name on signage and the name remained in use both informally and as its business name well into the 1980s. Simpsons-Sears officially changed its name to Sears Canada in 1984.

Simpsons closed on June 27, 1981, the store in Regina, Saskatchewan it had operated since 1916 after four consecutive years of financial losses with that location. It also closed its only store in Ottawa on January 29, 1983. The 83,000 square feet multi-level store had never been profitable ever since Simpsons acquired it in June 1972 and was notorious for not having any escalators.

In March 1983, The Bay store at Mayflower Mall in Sydney, Nova Scotia was rebranded to Simpsons.

In July 1984, Simpsons terminated 1,631 employees, including more than a thousand in Toronto alone. Simpsons lost $53 million that year alone.

The flagship store's acquisition of a large quantity of toy robots was a major plot point in the movie Short Circuit 2 in 1988.

Simpsons vanished from Greater Montreal in 1989 with its five stores either converted to The Bay or simply closed, leaving the chain with a presence only in the Toronto area. That year, the flagship Simpsons store in downtown Toronto completed a $30 million facelift with a relaunch known as the Miracle on Queen Street. HBC acknowledged at the time that Simpsons wasn't doing great in Toronto but was still performing well enough to continue there and even planned to add three more locations to the existing 11 stores in the area. The aforementioned openings did materialized in 1989 and 1990 at the Erin Mills, Mapleview Mall and Markville Shopping Centre.

=== The end ===
The Hudson's Bay Company attempted to operate Simpsons as a more-upscale nameplate than its main brand, The Bay, but was unsuccessful. The chain's operations in Greater Toronto were merged with The Bay in 1991 and the Simpsons name was retired after a retail presence of almost 120 years.

Reasons for the Hudson's Bay Company's decision were the recession and the fact that it rarely made profits with the Simpsons stores ever since the acquisition in the late 1970s. Simpsons struggled to stand out from The Bay. Although Simpsons was slightly higher end than The Bay, the distinction was hardly noticeable to the average shopper. The Hudson's Bay Company came to the conclusion that it would be better to rationalize its operations than to divide its customer base. Even as distinct department store chains, much of the operations of Simpsons and The Bay had already been consolidated starting in the 1980s. The Simpsons chain also suffered from an identity crisis within itself, with an upscale flagship downtown store filled with high-end merchandise in contrast to the mid-priced suburban mall locations that were basically like The Bay. When the merger was announced in June 1991, it had been suggested that the downtown location continue operating as a Simpsons store but HBC turned down the idea under the explanation that it would be too expensive to implement such plan.

Finally, the demise of Simpsons came at a time when the Hudson's Bay Company was seriously controlling its operating costs in anticipation of an eventual entrance to Canada by American giant Wal-Mart which was already conquering the retail landscape in its country and attracting Canadians living close to the border.

== Legacy ==
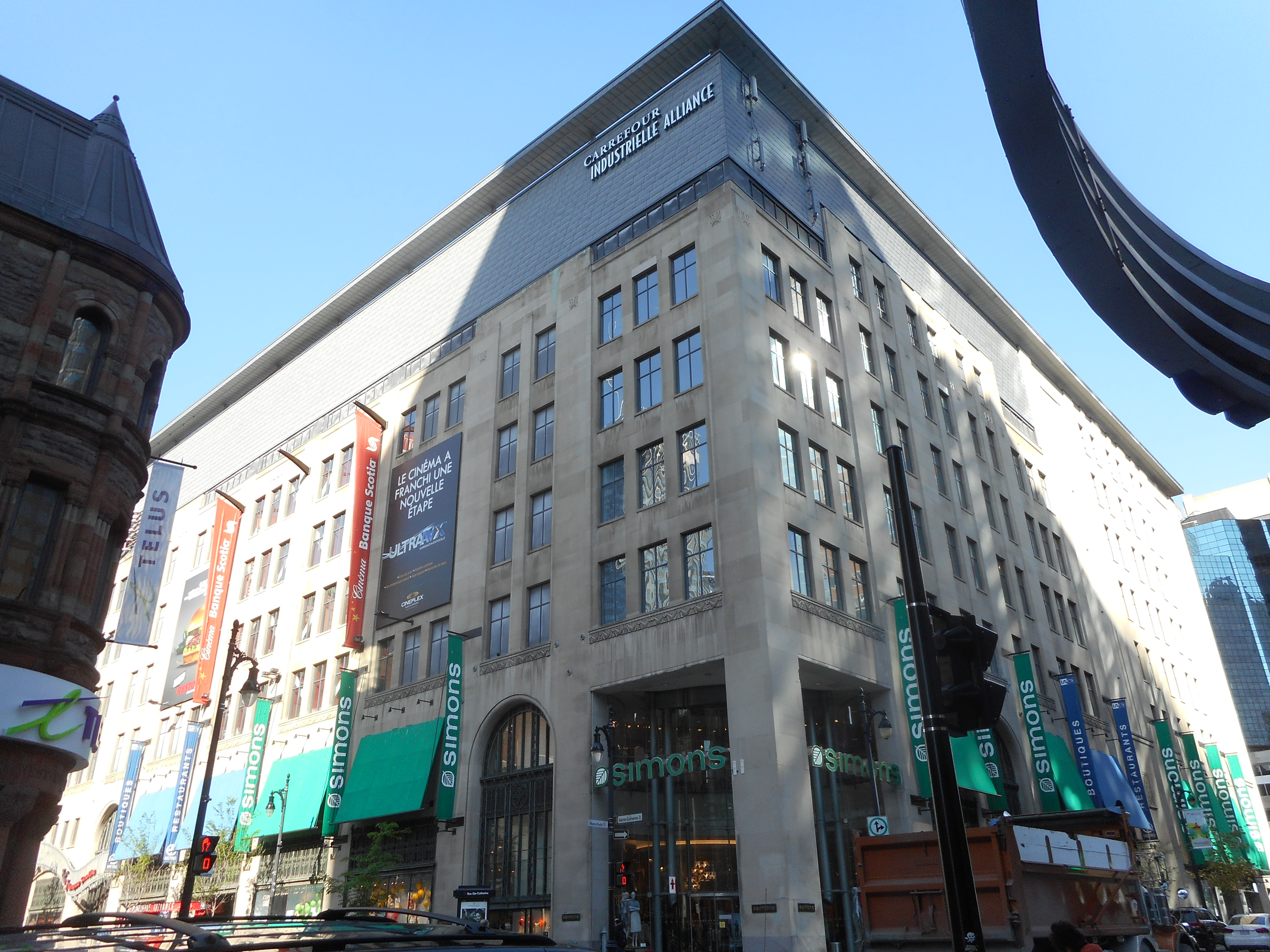
Former Simpsons building in Montreal, now Carrefour Industrielle Alliance mall.

The Simpsons store on Queen Street West in Toronto continued to operate under the Hudson's Bay nameplate as the chain's, and Canada's, largest department store until Hudson Bay's bankruptcy in 2025 and the adjacent Simpson Tower served as the headquarters of the Hudson's Bay Company's.

In 1991, Sears Canada acquired several Simpsons locations in the Toronto market, primarily where HBC had both Bay and Simpsons stores operating within the same shopping centre. When Simpsons folded in 1991, eight of its stores were absorbed by The Bay. The other six Simpsons stores were sold to Sears. Sears also acquired two existing The Bay stores at the Scarborough Town Centre and Yorkdale shopping malls. On the other hand, the Sears store at the Burlington Mall was sold to The Bay. The stores that went to The Bay were all rebranded on August 14, 1991. The locations that Sears acquired were closed in July 1991, renovated and progressively reopened at various dates in August and September 1991 with the former Simpsons/The Bay employees. The Sears store at Mapleview Mall in particular opened on August 14, 1991, the same date The Bay replaced its Simpsons locations. None of Simpsons' locations in 1991 closed outright as they were all changed to either The Bay or Sears stores with limited job losses.

Of the five Simpsons stores in Quebec, three of them - Anjou, Pointe-Claire and Laval - switched to The Bay on January 29, 1989. The three locations were rebranded in March 1989 after a transition period as Simpsons stores operated by The Bay. The other two Simpsons locations, in downtown Montreal and St-Bruno, closed because there were existing The Bay stores near them. HBC unsuccessfully tried to find a buyer for the Simpsons store in St-Bruno. The Bay store in St-Bruno eventually relocated to Simpsons' vacated location that same year. The downtown store closed on January 28, 1989, but reopened in mid-February for its final sale. After its clearance concluded on April 8, 1989, it was converted the following week (on April 15) as a Simpsons-branded liquidation centre, using 50 of the 900 employees of the original store and only two of the floors. The building later sat vacant for many years in the heart of the city's shopping district until it was turned in 1999 into a mall named Carrefour Industrielle Alliance, anchored by La Maison Simons and Famous Players (today Scotiabank Theatre).

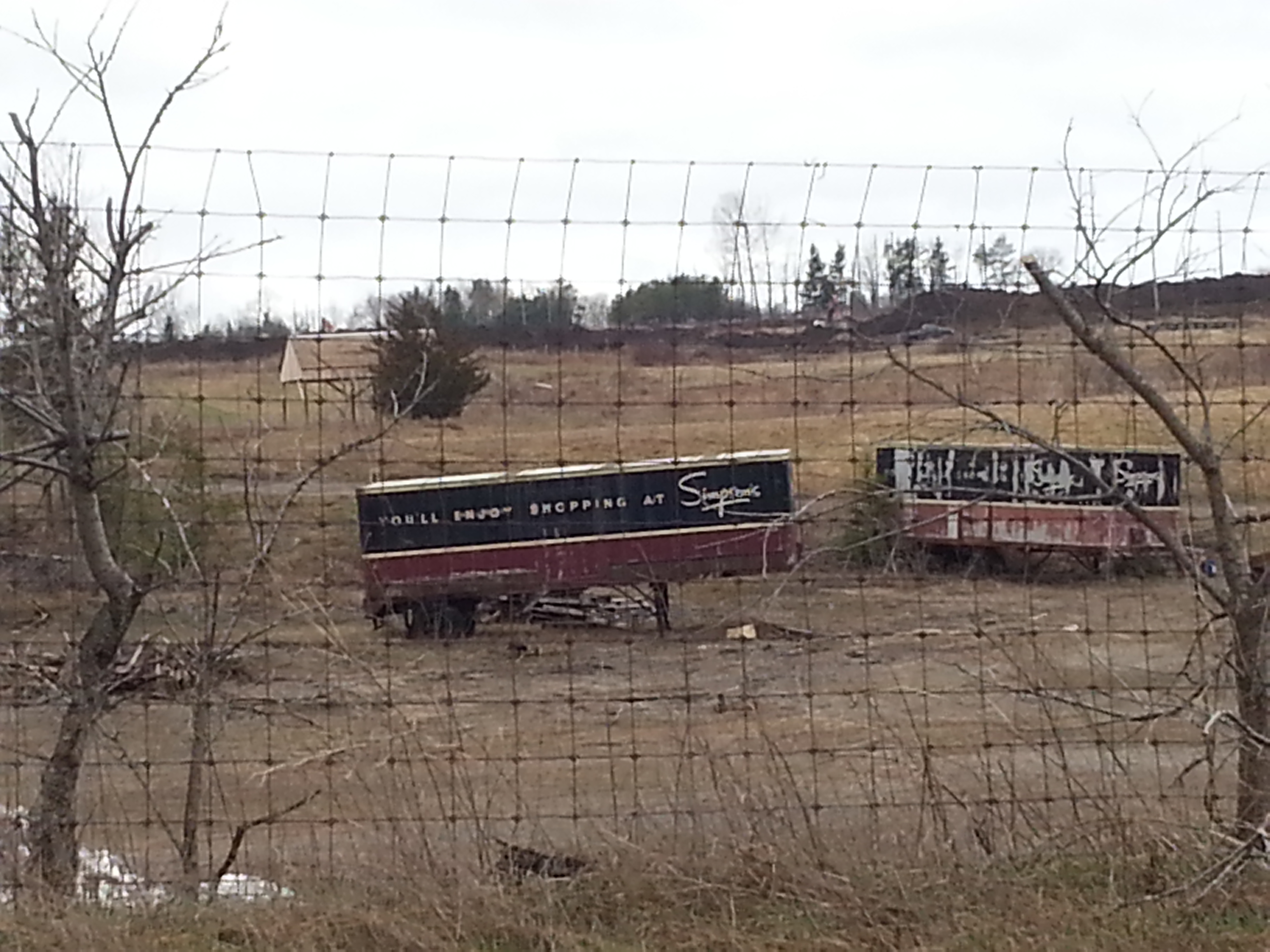
Old Simpsons department store trailers from 1960 on a field outside Whitby, Ontario

The Simpsons stores outside of the Greater Toronto and Greater Montreal areas were actually the first to be converted to The Bay on July 30, 1986. This included the stores in the province of Nova Scotia as well as Ontario locations in London, Kitchener, Kingston and Windsor. Like the ones in Toronto and Montreal, many of these The Bay stores lasted until HBC's demise in 2025 including those at White Oaks Mall, Cataraqui Centre, Fairview Park Mall, Devonshire Mall, Mic Mac Mall and Mayflower Mall. The Bay in Halifax, closed in 2011, was among the Simpsons stores rebranded in 1986.

After the Simpsons chain ceased to exist in 1991, the Hudson's Bay Company continued to accept Simpsons credit cards in its The Bay and Zellers stores until the company launched the HBC credit card in 2001.

The Canadian Intellectual Property Office database reports that the trademark to the name "Simpsons" was owned by Sears Canada from 2001 to 2008. It was purchased from the Hudson's Bay Company in 2001, ten years after the name had been retired. In 2008, Sears Canada transferred all of its trademarks (including the Simpsons trademark) to 1373639 Alberta Ltd., which appears to be a shell company of Sears Canada.

=== St. Regis Room and West End Shop ===
The two most "exclusive" clothing departments in the former Simpsons downtown Toronto location, the St. Regis Room (now known as the Room and extensively renovated in late 2009 by Yabu Pushelberg) for women and the West End Shop for men, are still in operation at the Bay's downtown Toronto Queen Street store. Designers in the St. Regis Room include Givenchy, Christian Lacroix, Valentino, Armani Collezioni, Louis Féraud, Karl Lagerfeld, Balmain, Andrew Gn, Lida Baday, Bellville Sassoon, David Hayes, and others. The West End shop designers include Hugo Boss, Strellson, and others.

While operated by Simpsons, the St. Regis Room offered some of the most exclusive fashion collections in Canada. Christian Dior, Oscar de la Renta, Yves Saint Laurent, Claude Montana, André Courrèges, and many others were featured in this luxury store.

== Governance ==
=== President ===
1. Robert Simpson, 1896–1897
2. Harris H. Fudger, 1898–1929
3. Charles L. Burton, 1929–1948
4. Edgar G. Burton Sr., 1948–1964
5. G. Allan Burton, 1964–1970
6. Charles B. Stewart, 1970–1976
7. Edgar G. Burton Jr, 1976–1978

=== Chairman of the Board ===
1. Sir Joseph W. Flavelle, 1925–1929
2. Harris H. Fudger, 1929–1930
3. Charles L. Burton, 1948–1956
4. Edgar G. Burton Sr., 1956–1968
5. G. Allan Burton, 1968–1978

== See also ==
- Sears Canada
- Hudson's Bay Company
- Hudson's Bay (department store)
- List of Canadian department stores
- Hudson's Bay flagship store
