= Grand Lake Road =

Community in Nova Scotia, Canada

Coordinates: 46°8′51.4″N 60°8′32.72″W

Grand Lake Road in Nova Scotia

Grand Lake Road is a community in the Canadian province of Nova Scotia, located in the Cape Breton Regional Municipality. The community is a retail service area of Cape Breton hosting the Mayflower Mall and several other outlets. Cape Breton University is also located in the community. The community was also home to 2 schools Lakevale and St. Augustine's Elementary which closed years ago.
