= W. A. H. MacBrien =

William Alfred Hawley MacBrien (February 22, 1883 – March 24, 1972) was vice president and later board chairman of the NHL's Toronto Maple Leafs for much of the 1940s and 1950s. He won 7 Stanley Cups with the team in 1932, 1942, 1945, 1947, 1948, 1949, and 1951. He died in 1972.
