= Pet Valu =

Canadian pet food and accessory retailer

Pet Valu Holdings Ltd.
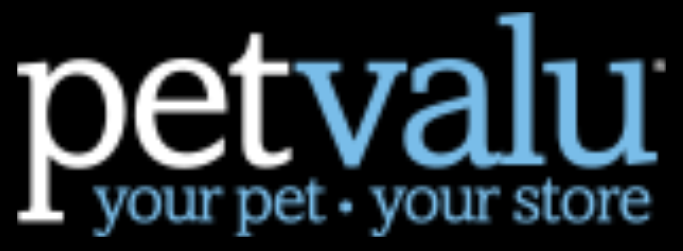
- Type: Public
- Traded as: TSX: PET
- Industry: Pet Retail
- Founded: 1976; 50 years ago
- Founder: Geoffrey Holt
- Headquarters: Markham, Ontario, Canada
- Number of locations: 824 (2024)
- Area served: Canada
- Key people: Greg Reimer (CEO)
- Products: Pet food, supplies, accessories
- Revenue: $1,097.2 million (2024)
- Operating income: $155.3 million (2024)
- Net income: $87.4 million (2024)
- Number of employees: ~2,100 (2024)
- Website: petvalu.ca

Pet Valu Holdings Ltd. is a Canadian pet food and accessory retailer founded in 1976.

The company's first initial public offering occurred in 2009 when Roark Capital Group took over the company for an estimated $144 million.

In 2010, Pet Valu acquired Bosley's Pet Foods Plus Inc., a Vancouver-based pet supply store chain. This acquisition gave Pet Valu a foothold in Western Canada. Previously, Pet Valu had been based almost entirely in Ontario and Manitoba.

In 2015, Pet Valu also acquired Tisol: Pet Nutrition And Supply Stores, a Vancouver based pet specialty retailer with 9 locations.

Bosley's stores were subsequently rebranded to "Bosley's by Pet Valu".

Pet Valu's stores, franchises and subsidiaries generated $574 million in 2019 and $648 million in 2020.

Richard Maltsbarger became its CEO in 2018. At the time, Roark Capital owned all of the company. However, when it completed its $316-million initial public offering on the Toronto Stock Exchange, Roark Capital sold some of its shares but retained sixty-two per cent.

RBC, Barclays Capital Canada, and CIBC World Markets underwrote the IPO.

As of 2024, Roark’s beneficial ownership is 39.2%.

In November 2020, the company announced that it would close all its stores located in the United States, with the reason for closing due to the COVID-19 pandemic.

At the end of 2021, the organization had 633 corporate and owned stores and franchises in Canada.

In 2022, Pet Valu acquired Quebec chain Chico's 66 stores.

According to Maltsbarger, the company owns 225 out of its 744 stores, while the remaining stores are franchised to local owner-operators.

== Sources ==
- "Pet Valu offers rosy outlook as it grows market share in lucrative pet industry". thestar.com. 2023-03-07. Archived from the original on 2023-03-07.
- McBain, Kevin (2020-11-24). "Pet store chain chomping at the bit to open in Liverpool". Toronto Star. Archived from the original on 2023-04-07.
- McBain, Kevin (4 December 2020). "Pet store chain chomping at the bit to open in Liverpool". LighthouseNOW Progress Bulletin.
