= Mapleview Centre =

Shopping mall in Burlington, Ontario, Canada

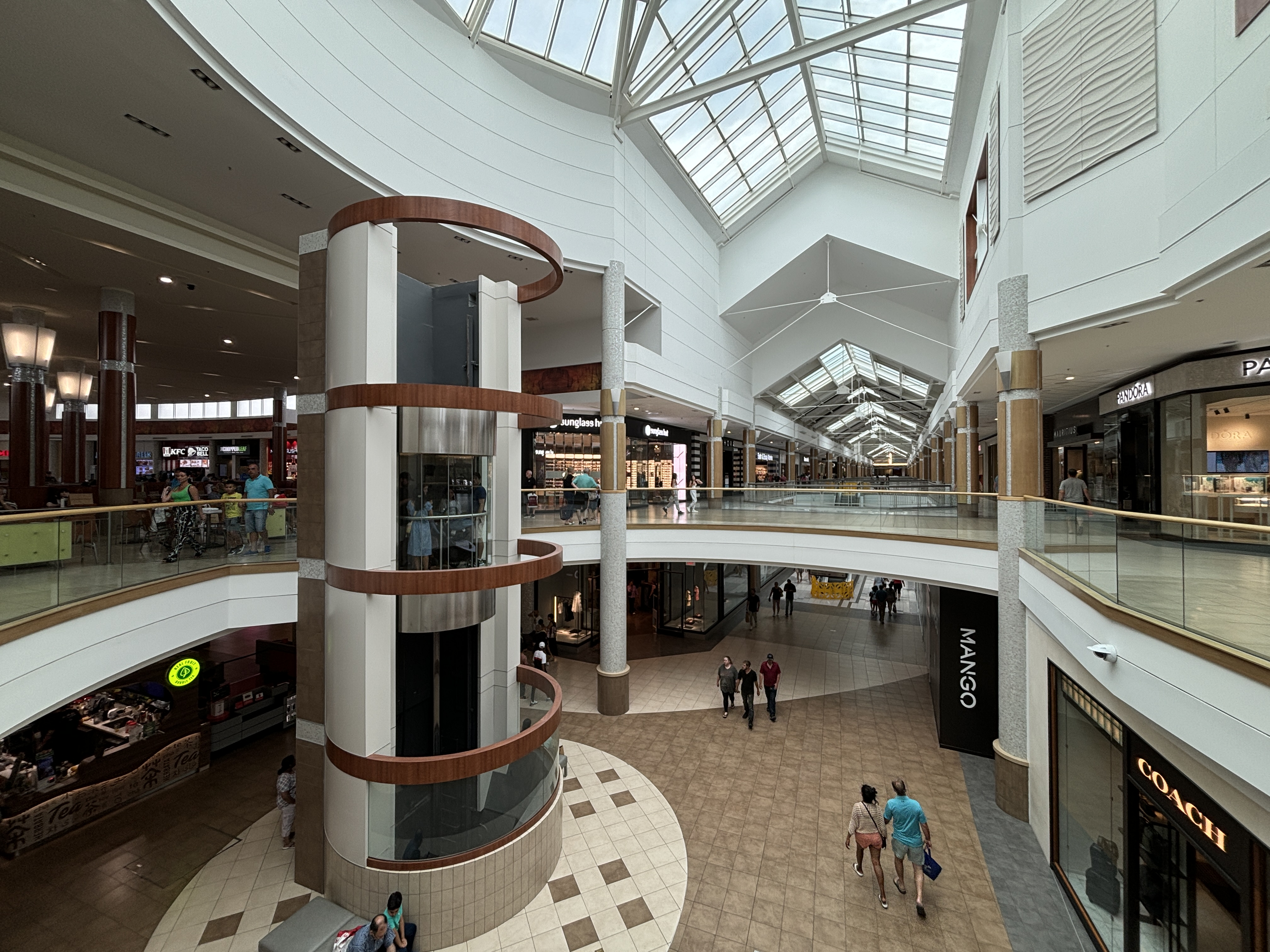
- Mapleview Shopping Centre in 2024
- Coordinates: 43.3257°N 79.8202°W
- Address: 900 Maple Avenue; Burlington, Ontario, Canada; L7S 2J8
- Opened: 1990; 36 years ago
- Manager: Ivanhoé Cambridge
- Owner: Ivanhoé Cambridge and Canapen (Halton) Ltd.
- Num. of stores: 180
- Num. of anchor tenants: 2 (1 vacant)
- Floor area: 635,531 sq. ft.
- Floors: 2
- Parking: 2,861
- Website: mapleviewcentre.com

Mapleview Centre, or simply Mapleview, is a two-story shopping mall located in Burlington, Ontario, Canada. It is located at the intersection of Maple Avenue and Fairview Street, south of the Queen Elizabeth Way (QEW). The name of the mall comes from the two streets in which it is located. It is owned by Ivanhoé Cambridge.

The main anchor store formerly was Hudson's Bay (now closed), with one other vacant anchor space last occupied by Sears which would later be split into three anchor tenants, Decathlon which anchors the lower portion opened in Spring 2021 and a new wing with a Sporting Life and a Linen Chest on the upper level. Restaurants include Turtle Jack's Muskoka Grill and Earl's Kitchen and Bar.

The mall opened in September 1990 under the management of Cambridge, anchored with The Bay and Simpsons. Less than a year later, Sears acquired on June 5, 1991 the Simpsons location from parent company Hudson's Bay Company to inaugurate its Mapleview store on August 14, 1991. This was actually a relocation of an existing Sears store with its employees from the nearby Burlington Mall. In parallel to this, Simpsons moved to Sears' former location in the Burlington Mall and was renamed to The Bay. The Bay store at Mapleview was not impacted by any of this.

In late 2008 to 2010 the mall went through extensive $64,000,000 renovations. The contract was awarded to EllisDon.
