= G. Allan Burton =

Canadian businessman (1915–2002)

- Born: 20 January 1915; Toronto, Ontario
- Died: 10 May 2002 (aged 87); Hamilton, Ontario
- Education: University of Toronto (1933–35)
- Spouse(s): Audrey Caro Syer (m. 1938; died 1975) Betty Kennedy (m. 1976)

George Allan Burton DSO ED CM (20 January 1915 – 10 May 2002) was a Canadian businessman who served as president and chairman of Simpsons. Additionally, he served as commanding officer of the Governor General's Horse Guards, part of Canada's household division. Burton was a notable corporate director in Toronto in the 1960s and 1970s. He became chairman of Simpsons in 1968 and in 1978 was responsible for the company's sale to the Hudson's Bay Company. He died on 10 May 2002 at age 87.
