= Burlington Centre =

Shopping mall in Burlington, Ontario, Canada

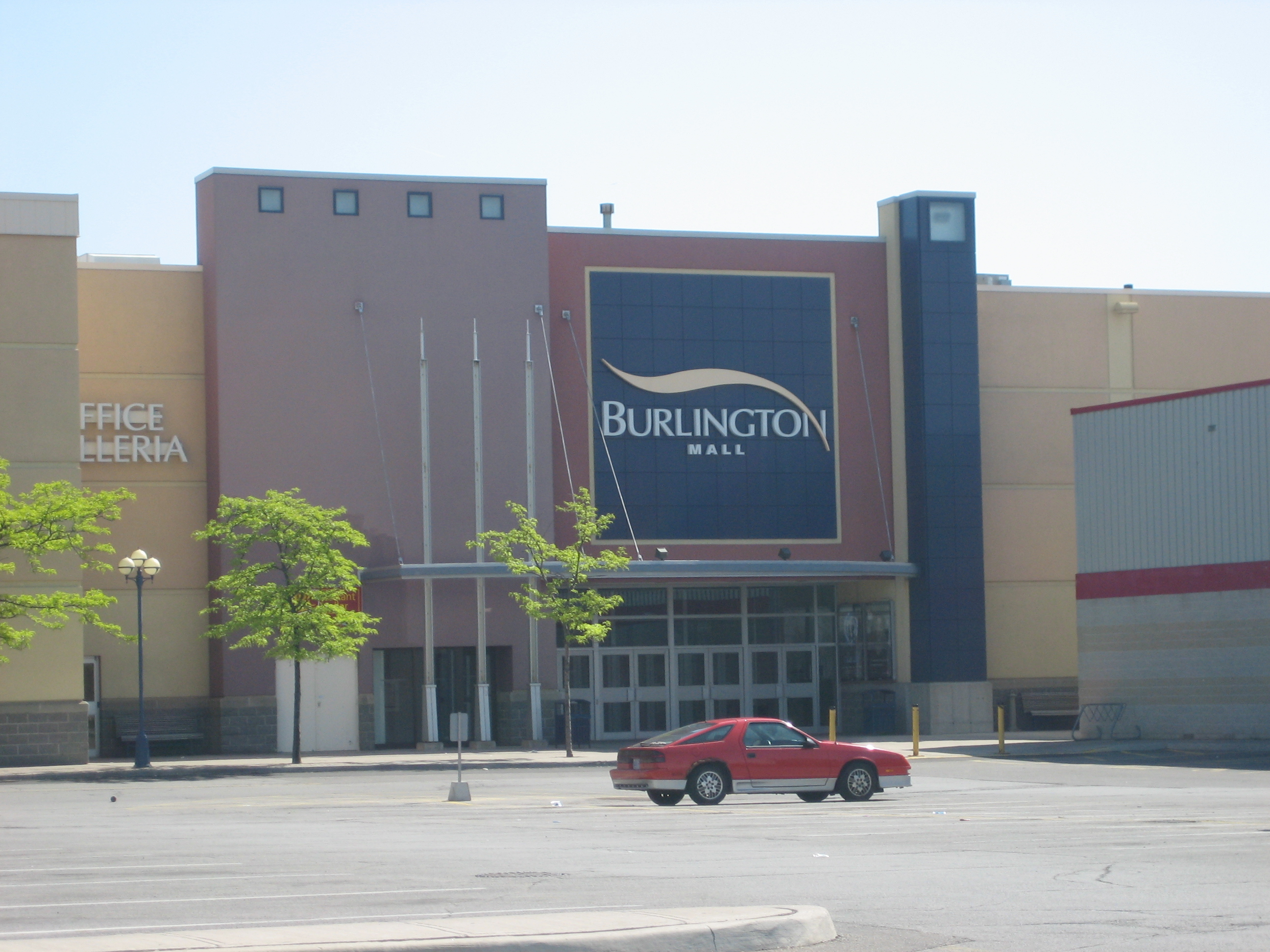
- The Burlington Centre entrance in 2007
- Coordinates: 43.3475°N 79.7949°W
- Address: 777 Guelph Line; Burlington, Ontario, Canada; L7R 3N2
- Opened: 1968
- Previous names: Burlington Mall
- Owner: Primaris Reit
- Num. of stores: 132
- Num. of anchor tenants: 8
- Floors: 2
- Parking: 4,623
- Website: burlingtoncentre.ca

Burlington Centre (formerly known as Burlington Mall) is a 721,000-square-foot (67,000 m^{2}) shopping mall located in Burlington, Ontario, Canada. It is one of the two enclosed malls in Burlington, Ontario, the other being the Mapleview Centre. The stores at Burlington Centre include HomeSense, Old Navy and Winners. It has two floors, the upper floor covers the wing leading to the food court, the floor above the food court area, and the second floor of the former Hudson's Bay location. The former Hudson's Bay store gained national media attention in 2021 for its Zellers pop-up shop, but was closed on February 9, 2025.

The mall was developed by Cambridge Leasoholds and opened in October 1968. It was a 60-store complex anchored by Simpsons-Sears, Dominion, G.W Robinson and Famous Players. Sears sold its store lease and fixtures to The Bay which took over the location on August 14, 1991. In 1995, the Hudson's Bay Company bought the Robinson's chain and transferred the location at Burlington Mall to its Zellers subsidiary since there was already The Bay in the mall. Zellers eventually closed on September 17, 2012, and was replaced by Target Canada which opened on March 19, 2013. After Target closed itself in early 2015, its space was divided for a Denninger's grocery retailer and relocated stores of Winners, Indigo and Starbucks stores. On February 9, 2025, the Hudson's Bay location was shuttered, leaving an anchor store of the mall empty.

Burlington Centre is located at the intersections of Guelph Line, Fairview and Prospect Streets, south of the Queen Elizabeth Way (QEW). The mall is owned by RioCan Management Inc., and was owned until mid-2011 by Ivanhoe Cambridge.

== Services ==
On the first floor there are retail stores and on the second floor there are medical, dental and professional offices. Just outside the mall to the south there is a farmers' market. The Burlington Centre Farmers' Market has been held since 1959.
