= Imperial Life =

Canadian life insurance company (1896–2001)

- Industry: Life insurance
- Founded: 23 April 1896
- Defunct: 28 December 2001
- Fate: Merged with Desjardins-Laurentian Life
- Successor: Desjardins Financial Security
- Headquarters: 95 St Clair Avenue West, Toronto, Ontario

The Imperial Life Assurance Company of Canada was a Canadian life insurance company that existed from 1896 to 2001. Imperial was founded by George Albertus Cox and was part of a network of financial companies he controlled, which included the Central Canada Loan & Savings Company, National Trust Company, and Dominion Securities Corporation.

In 1963, Paul Desmarais acquired control of Imperial, and in 1968 his holdings in the company were transferred to the Power Corporation of Canada. After its attempt to merge Imperial with Great-West Life was blocked, in 1977 Power sold its majority stake in Imperial to the Laurentian Group. The Laurentian Group merged with Desjardins, at which time Laurentian Life and Desjardins Life merged to form Desjardins-Laurentian Life, while Imperial Life remained independent. In 2001, Desjardins merged Imperial with Desjardins-Laurentian Life to form Desjardins Financial Security.

== History ==
Imperial was founded by federal statute in 1896. The company was formed by George Cox for his son Frederick George Cox (1866–1907), who wished to work in the life insurance industry. At the time, George Cox was the controlling shareholder of Canada Life and his two other sons, Edward William and Herbert Coplin, were employed by the company. George believed it would constitute excessive nepotism for a third son to be employed by the company, so he formed a new life insurance venture for Fred to manage. The founding directors in the articles of incorporation were John Hoskin, Samuel Casey Wood, Hugh Nicol Baird, Henry O'Hara, Sir Joseph Wesley Flavelle, and William Harty.

When Imperial began operations in October 1897, Fred was general manager, Sir Oliver Mowat was president, Flavelle was vice-president, and the board of directors included Sir Mackenzie Bowell, Alfred Ernest Ames, Edward Rogers Wood, and Senator Cox. The company was capitalised at $562,500. The company's first policy was written for Francis T. Nicholls, and was handwritten by George Cox. The first annual meeting was held in February 1898. At the meeting, company secretary Thomas Bradshaw reported that over 400 people had signed up for insurance worth $1.25 million.

In 1900, Imperial began its company magazine, The Agents' News, which was the first house magazine in Canada. Also that year, the company began to operate in the West Indes. In its fourth full year of operation, the company wrote $3.2 million of insurance. In May 1903, company president Sir Oliver Mowat died, and the following month was succeeded by Sir Mackenzie Bowell. Imperial continued its expansion in 1904 when it established representation in Trinidad, Dominica, St Kitts, and Barbados. That year, the home office staff numbered 28. The company settled its first major claim in 1905, when it paid $3,750 (equivalent to 25-years' salary), plus $100,000 in cash in 25 years for an automobile accident death.

Imperial began operating in South America in 1908 when it appointed representatives in British Guiana. At this time, Imperial had assets of $4.5 million and insurance in force of $23.7 million. In 1911, Imperial took the first step to including provisions for disability benefits. After the Titanic sank in April 1912, Imperial paid a total of $9,300 to the dependents of three men who died. The company's new head office, which had been begun in 1911 and was designed by George Martell Miller, opened in 1912. That year, Bowell, age 80, stepped down as president as was replaced by Herbert Coplin Cox.

Cox stepped down as president in 1914 after only two years in the office. His replacement was George Andrew Morrow, who would remain president for the next 22 years, the longest tenure of any Imperial president. During his time in office, Imperial's insurance in force grew from $45 million in 1914 to $281 million in 1936.

Between 1936 and 1938, the company's head office was given a new façade in Queenston Limestone. The design was done by Mathers & Haldenby.

In February 1963, Montreal financier Paul Desmarais, through his company Gelco Entreprises, acquired a 45 per cent stake in Imperial for $9 million. The following year, Desmarais increased his stake to 50.5 per cent. In 1968, Desmarais merged his holdings into the Power Corporation of Canada, and at that time became president of Power.

In March 1977, the Laurentian Fund Inc., a subsidiary of the Laurentian Mutual Life Assurance Company of Quebec City, acquired a 51 per cent stake in Imperial from the Power Corporation of Canada for $3 million. The purchase was followed by an offer to minority shareholders, which allowed Laurentian to increase its stake in Imperial to 95 per cent. By 1979, Laurentian owned 97 per cent of Imperial.

In July 1993, Desjardins acquired the Laurentian Group Corporation to create the Desjardins-Laurentian Financial Corporation. Accordingly, Desjardins became the owner of Imperial Life. In April 2001, Desjardins announced that it would merge Imperial Life and Desjardins-Laurentian Life later that year.

== Leadership ==
=== President ===
1. Sir Oliver Mowat, 1897–1903
2. Sir Mackenzie Bowell, 1903–1912
3. Herbert Coplin Cox, 1912–1914
4. George Andrew Morrow, 1914–1936
5. James Francis Weston, 1936–1947
6. John Gowans Parker, 1947–1953
7. Arthur Ross Poyntz, 1950–1967
8. Gordon Kingsley Fox, 1967–1977
9. William Gourlay Munro, 1977–1983
10. Claude Bruneau, 1983–1988
11. Robert St-Jacques, 1988–1993
12. Michel Thérien, 1993–1996
13. Marcel Pépin, 1996–2001

=== Chairman of the Board ===
1. James Francis Weston, 1947–1950
2. John Gowans Parker, 1953
3. Arthur Ross Poyntz, 1964–1976
4. Claude Castonguay, 1977–1983
5. Claude Bruneau, 1983–1989
6. Jacques Drouin, 1989–
7. Robert O'Farrell
