= Frank Porter Wood =

Canadian businessman and philanthropist (1882 - 1955)

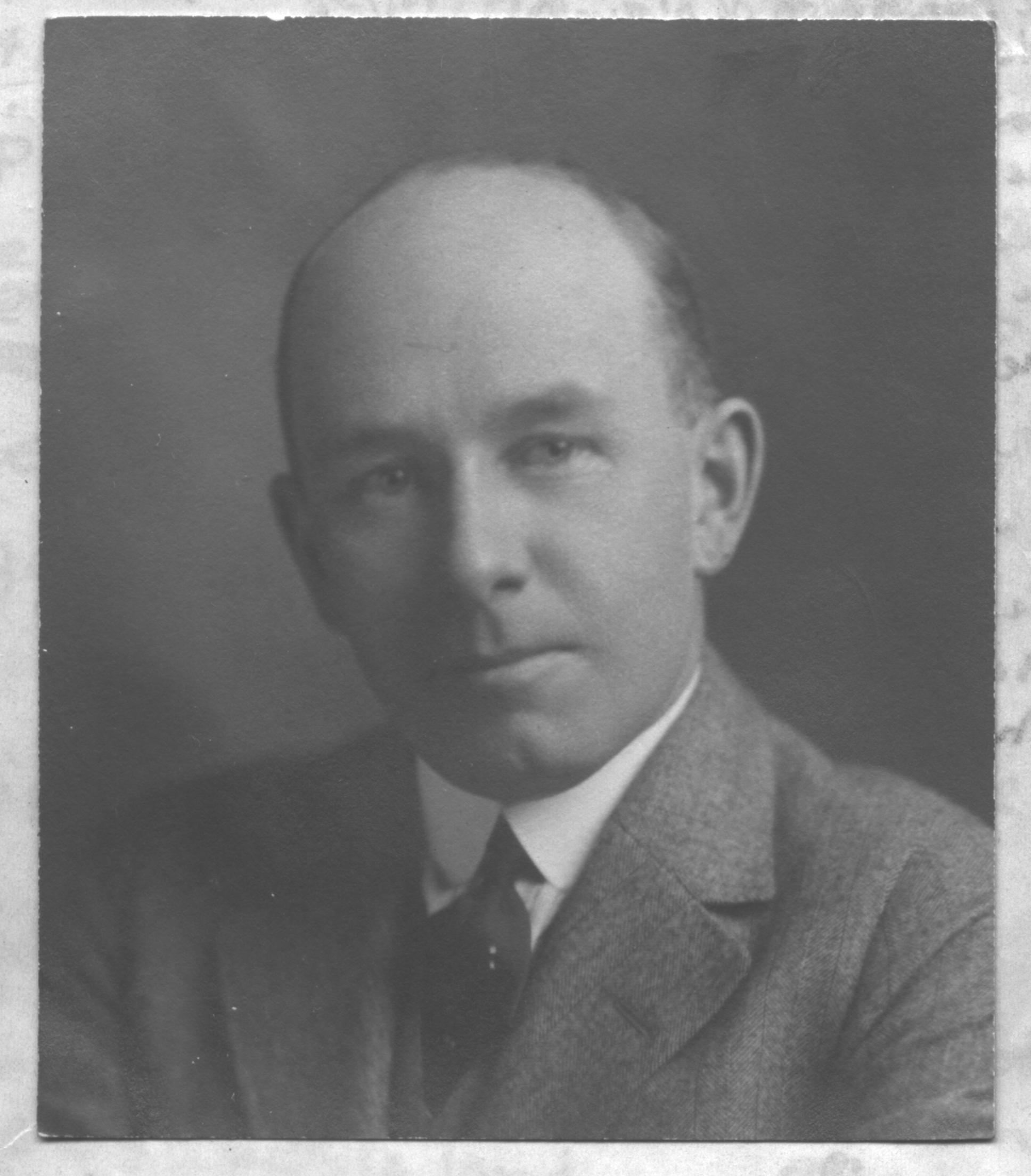
Frank Porter Wood in 1924

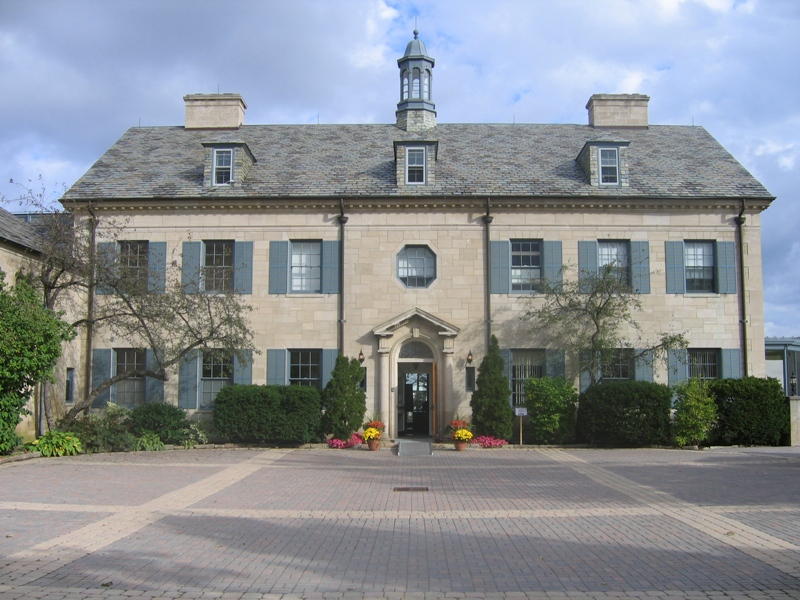
Wood's home on Bayview Avenue, which now houses the Crescent School

Frank Porter Wood (29 June 1882 – 20 March 1955) was a Canadian businessman and philanthropist. He is best remembered for his many gifts and bequests of artworks to the Art Gallery of Ontario in Toronto.

== Life and career ==
Wood was born in Peterborough, Ontario, to Canadian immigrants of mixed parentage: his father was Irish (John W. Wood) and his mother was Scottish (Jane Porter). He married Emma Matilda Junkin in 1906 and had three daughters: Mary (Mollie) Dorothy Porter Wood, Frances (Franie) Junkin Wood and Joyce Rogers Wood.

In 1897, he started working in Peterborough as a clerk for the Central Canada Loan and Savings Company, established by Senator George Albertus Cox. In 1899, Wood moved to Montreal to work for the National Trust Company, incorporated a year earlier by Cox and Wood's brother, Edward Rogers Wood. Later in life, he became a Vice-President of the National Trust.

In 1903, Wood started up, with Sir Frank Wilton Baillie and his brother James Wilton Baillie, a brokerage firm called Baillie Brothers and Company (later Baillie, Wood, and Croft), which operated on the Toronto Stock Exchange. In 1910, Wood became President of Burlington Steel. Baillie, Wood and Croft was dissolved at the end of 1915 and taken over by Bankers’ Bond Company Limited of which Wood was made vice-president.

Late in 1914, Wood and Sir Frank Baillie collaborated with the owners of the Chadwick Brass Company in Hamilton to set up the large Canadian Cartridge Company Limited, of which Sir Frank Baillie became President and Wood Vice-President. Until his death in 1955, Wood continued to participate in the Canadian business community as a financier.

== Philanthropy ==
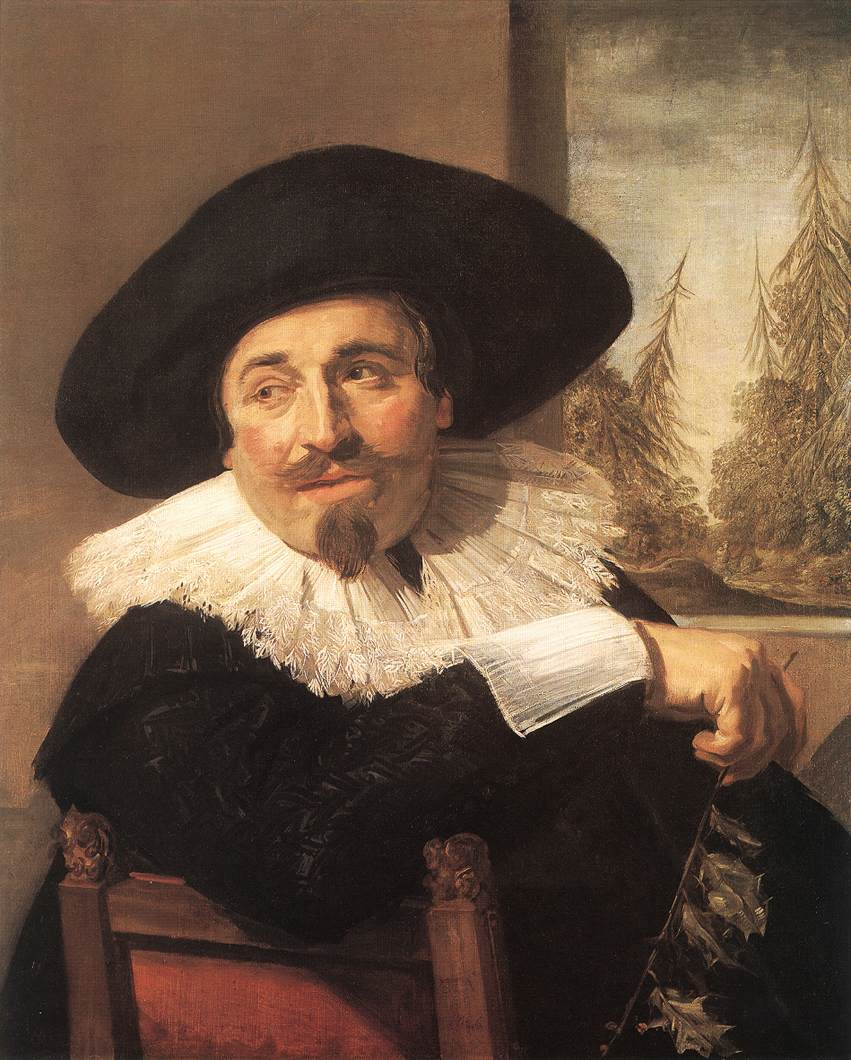
Portrait of Isaak Abrahamsz. Massa by Frans Hals, 1626, donated to the Art Gallery of Ontario in 1955 by Wood

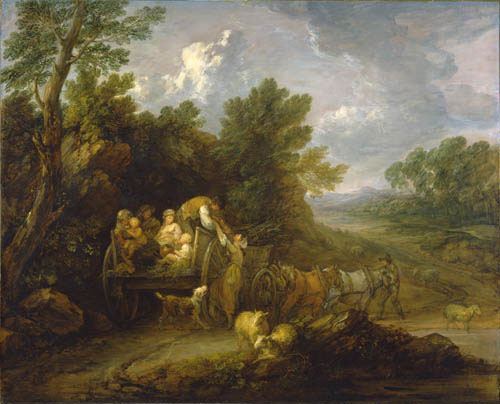
The Harvest Wagon by Thomas Gainsborough, donated to the Art Gallery of Ontario in 1955 by Wood

Wood and his family were consummately modest; they never spoke of their accolades and were quickly forgotten. Wood, however, will be remembered not for his business accomplishments but for his love of the arts and philanthropy. To this date, he is still the single most generous donor to the Art Gallery of Ontario. "He is given a place of honour among the earlier collectors of Old Master paintings in Toronto", according to David McTavish of Queen's University and a former curator of the Art Gallery of Toronto.

Wood was a client of Sir Joseph Duveen. Like most of Duveen's clients, Wood donated his paintings to public institutions, as well as his residence on Bayview Avenue, which was distinguished by its Beaux-Arts architecture (influenced and built by William Adams Delano) and now houses the Crescent School.

He died on 20 March 1955 in Toronto, and his major bequests to the Art Gallery of Ontario included The Harvest Wagon by Thomas Gainsborough, Daedalus Warning His Son Icarus by Anthony van Dyck, A Portrait of Dr. Joseph Joachim by John Singer Sargent, Portrait of Isaak Abrahamsz. Massa by Frans Hals, Young Woman with a Lapdog by Rembrandt van Rijn, and Portrait of Vincent Laurensz van der Vinne by Frans Hals.

Other paintings owned or donated by Wood included artists such as Berthe Morisot, Camille Pissarro, Auguste Renoir, Lambert Sustris, Francisco de Goya y Lucientes, Maurice Utrillo, Claude Monet, Aelbert Cuyp, Auguste Rodin, Francesco Raibolini (known as Francia), Jacopo Comin (Tintoretto), Tiziano Vecelli and Jacob van Ruisdael, to mention only a few.
