= Anthony S. Fell =

Canadian businessman (born 1939)

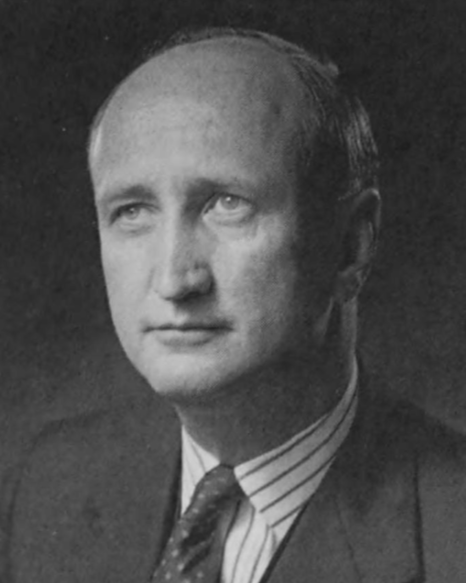
- Born: 23 February 1939 (age 87); Toronto, Ontario
- Education: St Andrew's College ('59)
- Spouse: Sharon Helen Lord Graham (m. 1965)

Anthony Smithson Fell (born 23 February 1939) is a Canadian retired investment dealer who served from 1973 to 1992 as president and from 1992 to 2007 as chairman of Dominion Securities. During his tenure as head of Dominion, Fell grew the company to become the country's largest investment brokerage.

== Biography ==
Fell was born on 23 February 1939 in Toronto to Charles Percival Fell (1894–1988) and Grace Elizabeth Matthews (1898–1974). Charles Fell worked in finance and had begun his career in 1921 in New York with Dillon, Read & Co. From 1929 to 1934 he too worked for the Dominion Securities Corporation, and then from 1934 to 1967 was president of Empire Life. Grace was the daughter of Albert Edward Matthews, the 16th Lieutenant-Governor of Ontario, and the sister of army officer Albert Bruce Matthews. Charles and Grace married in 1925 and had four children: Fraser, Albert, Margaret, and Anthony. Anthony's older brother Fraser Matthews Fell (1928–2020) went onto serve as the chairman of Dome Mines. The Fell family are Baptists.

Tony Fell graduated from St. Andrew's College in Aurora in 1959, and that same year joined Dominion Securities. From 1980 to 2000, he was the chief executive officer of Dominion Securities, which RBC purchased a majority stake in 1988 and completely acquired in 1996; thereafter Fell assumed the title of Deputy Chairman of RBC from 1998 to 2000, making him the number two executive after John Cleghorn, the chairman and CEO of the bank holding company RBC. In 2000, Fell relinquished his Deputy Chair title and was succeeded as CEO of RBC Capital Markets by Gord Nixon (who would succeed Cleghorn as CEO of RBC in 2001), and that year RBC DS was also rebranded to RBC Capital Markets (RBC CM). Fell remained Chairman of RBC CM until he retired in 2007.

After retiring from RBC, Fell remains a corporate director. He sits on the board of directors of multiple corporations, including BCE Inc., CAE Inc., and Loblaw Companies In 2001, he was made an Officer of the Order of Canada.
