= Mesh Pillay =

Mesh Pillay is the founder and CEO at YW Capital an African empowerment entity with assets in real estate, resources, ICT and other sectors. He is also Chairman of the Assore BEE Trust and founder of Elever Limited. YW Capital's advisory council is constituted with some of the most influential and powerful individuals across the African continent. Previously an investment banker and businessman based between London and Johannesburg, South Africa. He spent time at both Deutsche Bank and Renaissance Capital, and is former head of Equity Capital Markets for sub-Saharan Africa at Standard Bank. He is considered to be one of the few bankers and entrepreneurs with in-depth African experience and reach into significant pools of capital earmarked for Africa. More recently being involved with some of the largest privatisations on the continent and represents various African governments.

More recently he has partnered with Laliga -the Spanish Football League to negotiate their commercial contracts across Africa and India. He has worked with some of the largest Indian corporations with interests in Africa including, the Tata Group, Jindal, Murugappa Group and the respective families.

Many of the global sovereign funds seek his insights on their equity investments on the continent including Abu Dhabi Investment Corporation (UAE), CDC (UK), Tamasek (Singapore) and PIF (Saudi Arabia).

He has studied at the University of Cape Town, Duke University, Columbia University, Imperial College (London).
