= RBC Dominion Securities =

Canadian investment brokerage

- Industry: Securities
- Founded: 18 March 1901
- Headquarters: Royal Bank Plaza, Toronto, Ontario
- Parent: Royal Bank of Canada (1988–present)

RBC Dominion Securities Inc. is a Canadian investment brokerage that has been in operation since 1901. The brokerage was founded by George Albertus Cox and was part of a network of financial companies he controlled. In 1973, DS appointed Anthony S. Fell president. Fell set out on an acquisitions spree that saw DS buy eight other brokerages between 1973 and 1996. Following its takeover of A. E. Ames & Company in 1981, DS surpassed Wood Gundy to become Canada's largest brokerage.

Until 1987, Canadian banks were barred from participation in securities trading. That year, deregulation of Canadian securities law – known as the "Little Bang" (after the "Big Bang" of 1986) – allowed banks to enter the securities business. Consequently, on 31 March 1988, the Royal Bank of Canada acquired a 67 per cent stake in DS for $385 million. Upon the purchase, the company was renamed RBC Dominion Securities Inc. In 1996, the Royal Bank acquired outright control of the brokerage.

Today, Dominion Securities forms part of the RBC Wealth Management unit, along with the Royal Trust Company and Phillips Hager & North.

== History ==
Dominion Securities was established in Toronto, Ontario, Canada on 18 March 1901 as Dominion Securities Corporation Limited. Its founders, Senator George Albertus Cox and Edward Rogers Wood, were both well known Canadian business figures at the time, having previously formed the National Trust Company together in 1898. The firm originally focused on the underwriting and new issue of government and municipal bonds but diversified into war bonds during World War I and into equity securities in later years. At the time of incorporation, DS was located at 26 King Street East in Toronto. When the formation of the company was announced, the directors named were Henry Pellatt, George Edwards, Robert Armstrong, Anthony L'Estrange Malone, and Albert Mearns. Dominion Securities was capitalised at $1 million.

By 1958, the firm had developed a large network of branches including locations in every major Canadian city as well as international offices in New York, Boston, Philadelphia, and London. The late 1950s saw Dominion Securities fully involved in the trading of securities on the secondary markets as members of The Toronto, Montreal, Winnipeg, and Canadian Stock Exchanges, as well as affiliate members of the American Stock Exchange. They also had access to the NYSE and numerous other exchanges at the time. During this period, DS maintained a head office at 50 King Street West in Toronto and was headed by President G.E. Phipps, Chairman G.P. Rutherford, and Vice-chairman, H. N. Bawden.

The firm grew through acquisitions and itself was gradually acquired by Royal Bank of Canada where it became the corporate and investment banking subsidiary of the bank holding company.

Dominion Securities was the last of the major brokerages to be taken over by banks, following the purchases of Wood Gundy by the Canadian Imperial Bank of Commerce, Nesbitt Thomson by the Bank of Montreal, Burns Fry by Security Pacific Bank, Lévesque Beaubien Geoffrion by the National Bank of Canada, and McLeod Young Weir by the Bank of Nova Scotia.

In 2000, the investment banking subsidiary rebranded itself from RBC Dominion Securities to RBC Capital Markets. However the Dominion Securities brand is still used today; RBC Dominion Securities Inc is the legal name of the company from which the full service brokerage activities operate. In addition, RBC Dominion Securities is the broker dealer subsidiary used by RBC Capital Markets in Canada.

On July 9, 2020, a class action lawsuit was filed by former RBC Dominion Securities employee Leigh Cunningham and others, claiming that the company owes them for unpaid statutory holidays and other vacation days, and seeking damages of $800 million. The lawsuit was certified by the Supreme Court of Ontario on December 29, 2022.

== Acquisitions ==
- Harris & Partners Ltd. – 1973
- Draper Dobie Ltd. – 1977
- A. E. Ames & Co. – 1981
- Pitfield Mackay Ross Ltd. – 1984
- Molson Rousseau Inc. – 1986
- Pemberton Securities Inc. – 1989
- McNeil Mantha Inc. – 1989
- Richardson Greenshields of Canada Ltd. – 1996

== Leadership ==
=== President ===
1. George Albertus Cox, 1901–1912
2. Edward Rogers Wood, 1912–1929
3. Arthur Frank White, 1929–1945
4. Kenneth McKinnon Pringle, 1945–1951
5. Henry Norman Bawden, 1951–1953
6. Geoffrey Edmund Phipps, 1953–1965
7. Douglas Henry Ward, 1965–1969
8. Frank Henderson Logan, 1969–1973
9. Anthony Smithson Fell, 1973–1992
10. William Reay Mackay, 1992–1998
11. Charles Martin Winograd, 1998–2008

=== Chairman of the Board ===
1. Kenneth McKinnon Pringle, 1951–1954
2. George Percival Rutherford, 1954–1965
3. Geoffrey Edmund Phipps, 1965–1967
4. Douglas Henry Ward, 1969–1980
5. William Bowles Harris, 1973–1974
6. Frank Henderson Logan, 1980–1981
7. James Bruce Pitblado, 1981–1984
8. Ward Chipman Pitfield Jr., 1984–1985
9. James Bruce Pitblado, 1985–1992
10. Anthony Smithson Fell, 1992–2007
