= Young Woman with a Lapdog =

1665 painting by Rembrandt van Rijn

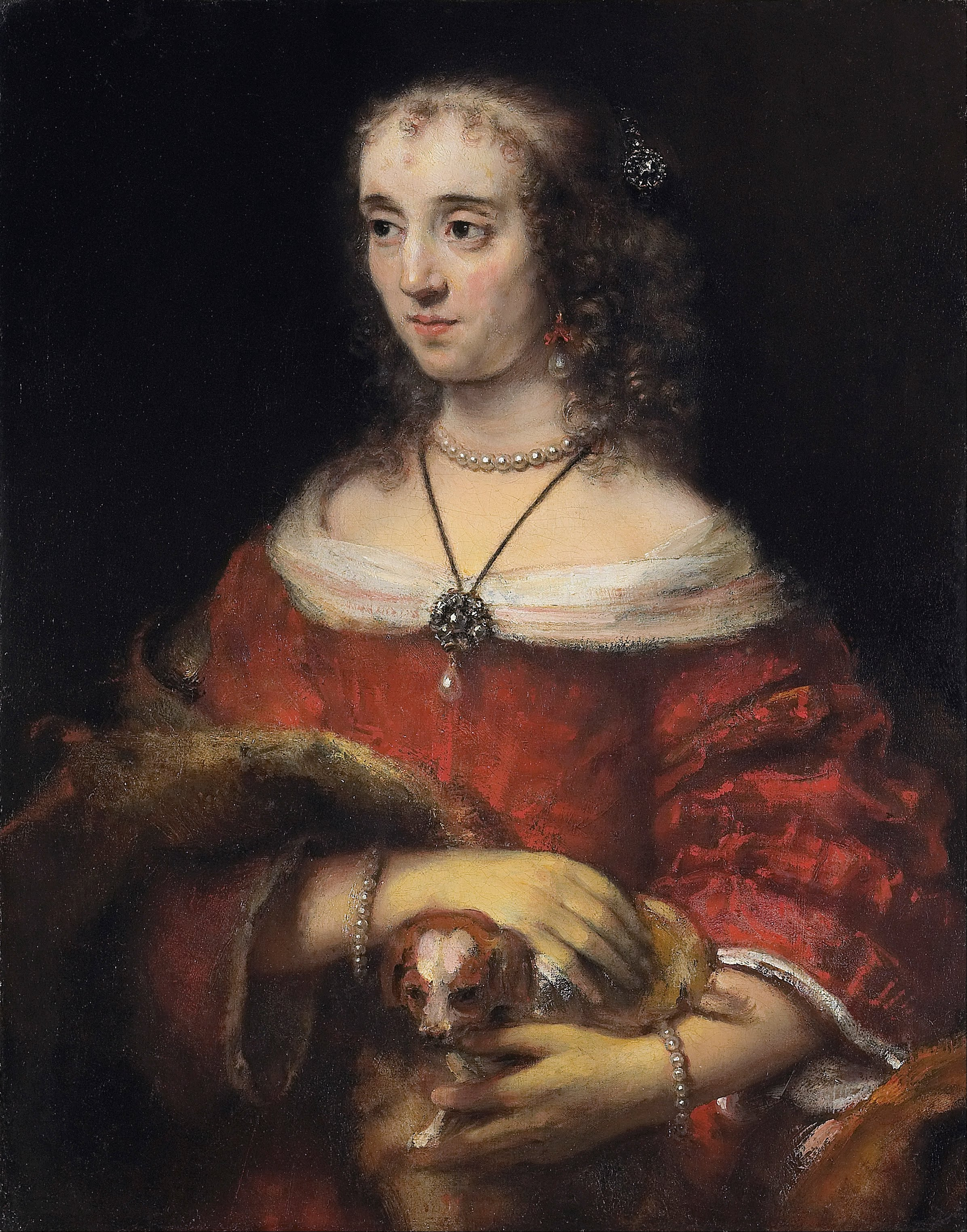
Young Woman with a Lapdog, 81 x 64 cm, oil on canvas

Young Woman with a Lapdog (Dutch: Portret van een vrouw met schoothondje) is a c. 1665 oil-on-canvas painting of an unknown young woman by Rembrandt. It is now in the Art Gallery of Ontario, to which it was bequeathed in 1955 by the philanthropist Frank Porter Wood. It was previously identified as Rembrandt's daughter-in-law Magdalena van Loo (1641–1669), but the subject is now held to be unknown.

X-radiographs reveal significant changes to the bottom half of the painting as Rembrandt explored lighting and color. According to Ernst van de Wetering, this aspect of the work reveals "the 'Late Rembrandt' at his best". The painting is not signed, but may have been before later overpainting.

== Theft ==
It was stolen in Toronto in September 1959 with four other works including Portrait of Isaak Abrahamsz. Massa and Portrait of a Seated Woman with a Handkerchief. All works were recovered in October 1959.

== See also ==
- List of paintings by Rembrandt
