= RBC Capital Markets =

Global investment bank

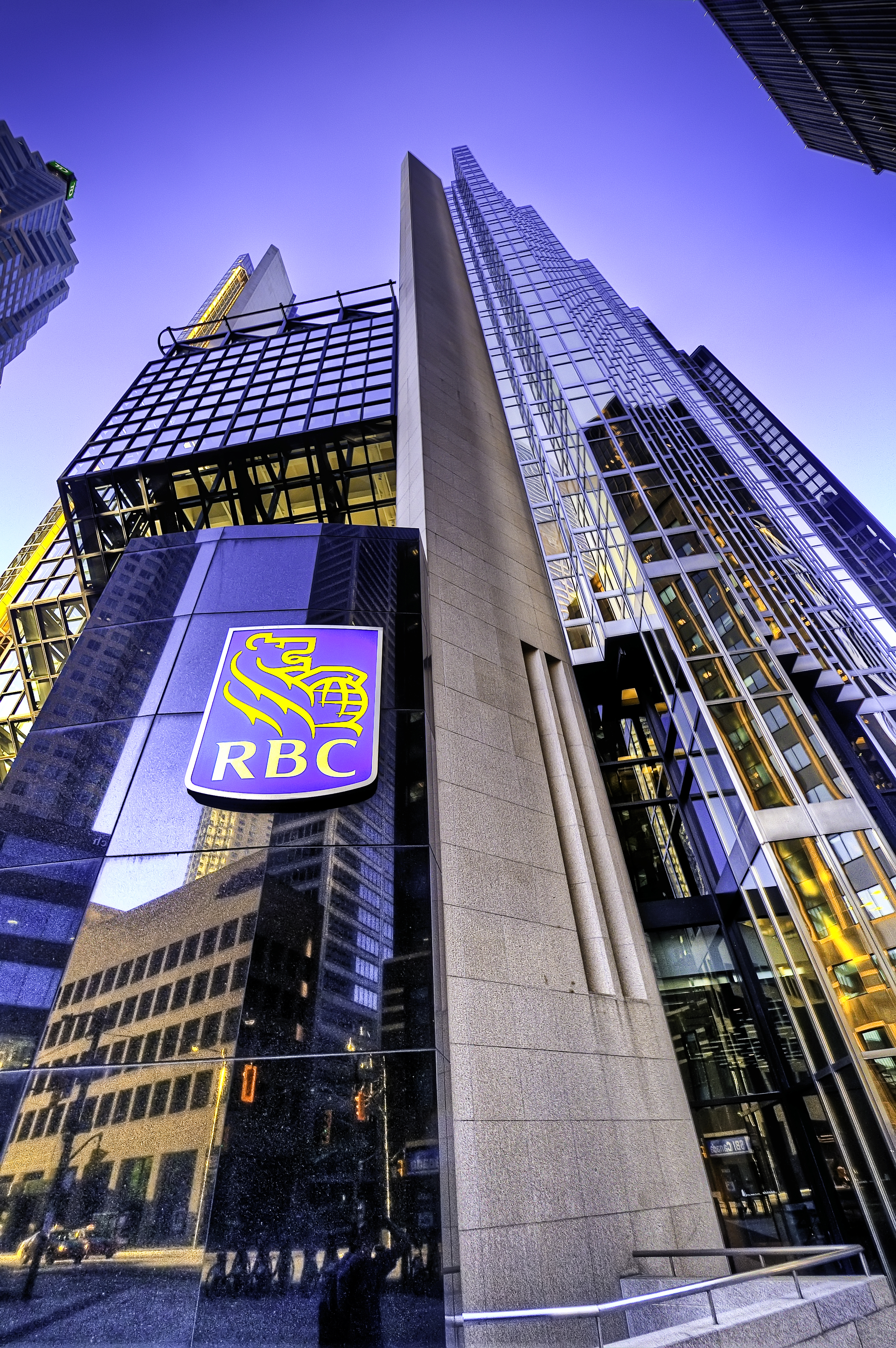
- Royal Bank Plaza in downtown Toronto, Canada
- Formerly: Dain Rauscher Wessels
- Type: Subsidiary of Royal Bank of Canada
- Industry: Investment banking, Capital market, Financial services
- Founded: Halifax, Nova Scotia, Canada in 1864
- Headquarters: 200 Bay St., Toronto, ON M5J 2J5, Canada
- Number of locations: 55 offices through 16 countries
- Area served: Worldwide
- Key people: Derek Neldner (CEO & Group Head); Manish Bhandari (CFO); Vito Sperduto (Head, US Capital Markets)
- Products: Investment Banking, Sales and Trading, Global Markets, US Municipal Finance
- Services: Investment banking; Capital market; Mergers and acquisitions; Equity capital markets; Leverage (finance); Corporate finance; Commodity market; Foreign exchange market; Derivatives market; Fixed income; Securitization; Equity derivative; Prime brokerage; Energy transition; Municipal bond
- Revenue: ▲ C$20.4 billion (2025)
- Net income: ▲ C$20.4 billion
- Total assets: ▲$2.6 trillion (2026)
- Number of employees: 7,600+
- Parent: Royal Bank of Canada
- Rating: Aa1 / AA− (Moody's / S&P)
- Website: www.rbccm.com/en/
- Footnotes; RBC (Parent) Market Cap: US$267 billion (Q2 2026). Ratings: Aa1 (Moody's) / AA− (S&P).

RBC Capital Markets is a global investment bank providing services in banking, finance, and capital markets to corporations, institutional investors, asset managers, and governments globally. Locations span 55 offices in 16 countries across North America, the UK, Europe, and the Asia-Pacific region. Employment estimates for RBC professionals are roughly 7,600 per company reports. Services provided include insights required to raise capital, access markets, mitigate risk, and acquire or dispose of assets for clients worldwide.

== Overview ==
RBC Capital Markets is part of Royal Bank of Canada (RBC). Operating since 1864, RBC is the seventh largest in North America and the 11th largest bank globally as measured by market capitalization. Royal Bank of Canada maintains its position as the safest bank in North America. Canadian banks dominate the list once again, taking the top seven spots.

== History ==
RBC Capital Markets traces its origins to 1864, when the Merchants' Bank was founded in Halifax, Nova Scotia, by a group of eight maritime merchants. Over more than 160 years, the institution evolved through a series of renamings, strategic acquisitions, and global expansions to become one of the leading investment banks in North America.

=== The Beginning (Pre-1901) ===
In 1864, eight prominent Halifax business figures — including Thomas C. Kinnear, Edward Kenny, and William Cunard — established the Merchants' Bank on the Halifax waterfront to provide credit to merchants importing and exporting through the port. The bank began with approximately $200,000 in capital and grew alongside the surge in commercial activity driven by the American Civil War, during which Halifax served as a hub for cross-border trade.

On June 22, 1869 — shortly after Canadian Confederation — the institution received a federal charter and was formally incorporated as the Merchants' Bank of Halifax. The first corporate seal adopted at incorporation depicted a three-mast sailing ship, reportedly belonging to founding director William Cunard, reflecting the institution's maritime identity. Thomas C. Kinnear served as its first president.

By 1893, the Merchants' Bank of Halifax became a publicly traded company, listing on the Montreal Exchange. In its early decades, the bank maintained a strong presence throughout the Maritimes while forging correspondent banking relationships in New York and London.

=== Going National (1901–1962) ===
In 1901, following a boardroom victory by executives who supported westward expansion, the institution was renamed The Royal Bank of Canada. The name change reflected the bank's national ambitions; by this time, branches were operating coast to coast, with several opened in British Columbia to serve the Klondike Gold Rush. At the time of the renaming, the bank operated 64 branches across the country.

To accompany the new name, a revised corporate seal was commissioned featuring a heraldic design — a unicorn, a lion, a quartered shield, and the royal motto Dieu et Mon Droit — which became the Royal Bank's first publicly recognized symbol both domestically and internationally. In 1903, the bank opened its first Toronto branch. In 1907, the board approved moving the head office from Halifax to Montreal. By 1908, branches had been established in every provincial capital under the presidency of Herbert Holt, a prominent Montreal businessman.

During this same period, in 1901, a separate firm — Dominion Securities Corporation Limited — was incorporated in Toronto. Founded independently of the Royal Bank, Dominion Securities initially focused on government and municipal bonds, and would later become a foundational institution in the development of the Canadian bond market. Its business expanded significantly during the First World War through the issuance of war bonds.

=== An Iconic Emblem (1962–2001) ===
In 1962, the Royal Bank of Canada introduced its first purpose-built corporate logo: a heraldic emblem incorporating a lion symbolizing strength, a crown representing royal heritage, and a globe signifying global presence. The logo quickly became one of the most recognizable corporate symbols in Canada and remained in use for nearly four decades.

Meanwhile, Dominion Securities continued to grow as Canada's leading independent investment dealer. In 1937, a stock trading department was added, completing the firm's full-service investment capabilities. In 1984, Dominion Securities expanded through the acquisition of Pitfield, Mackay, Ross Limited.

The regulatory environment shifted decisively in 1987, when the deregulation of Canadian securities law — colloquially known as the "Little Bang" — permitted Canadian banks to enter the securities business for the first time. On March 31, 1988, the Royal Bank of Canada acquired a 67 per cent stake in Dominion Securities Inc. for $385 million, subsequently renaming the firm RBC Dominion Securities Inc. In 1989, RBC Dominion Securities further grew through the acquisition of Pemberton Willoughby Investment Corporation.

In 1995, the New York office of RBC Dominion Securities acquired Kidder Peabody's equity derivatives group, leading to the formation of the Global Equity Derivatives (GED) group — an early step toward combining the bank's corporate banking strength with new investment banking capabilities. In 1996, the Royal Bank acquired full, 100 per cent ownership of Dominion Securities Inc., and that same year RBC Dominion Securities acquired Richardson Greenshields of Canada Ltd. for $480 million.

=== Looking Forward (2001–Present) ===
In 2000, the investment banking operations of RBC Dominion Securities were rebranded as RBC Capital Markets, marking the formal establishment of a dedicated global capital markets platform. The following year, RBC Capital Markets expanded its North American presence significantly through the acquisition of U.S.-based investment firm Dain Rauscher Wessels for approximately US$1.46 billion, and the subsequent integration of Tucker Anthony Sutro & Co.

Concurrent with this expansion, in 2001 the Royal Bank of Canada launched a new corporate master brand — the modern RBC logo — characterized by a simplified lion-and-globe design set against a blue background. The redesign reflected the organization's evolution into a diversified global financial services company while retaining visual continuity with the heraldic tradition established in 1962.

Today, RBC Capital Markets operates as the investment banking and capital markets division of Royal Bank of Canada, employing roughly 7,600 professionals across 55 offices in 16 countries throughout North America, the United Kingdom, Europe, and the Asia-Pacific region. The firm provides services in equity and debt underwriting, mergers and acquisitions, sales and trading, and financial advisory to corporations, institutional investors, asset managers, private equity firms, and governments worldwide.

=== Brand Evolution Timeline ===
Period	Brand Name	Key Identity Feature
1864–1869	Merchants' Bank	Halifax waterfront founding; no formal seal
1869–1901	Merchants' Bank of Halifax	Three-mast sailing ship corporate seal
1901–1962	The Royal Bank of Canada	Heraldic seal: unicorn, lion, shield, Dieu et Mon Droit
1962–2001	Royal Bank of Canada / RBC Dominion Securities	Lion, crown, and globe heraldic logo
2001–present	RBC / RBC Capital Markets	Simplified lion-and-globe on blue; modern master brand

== Broker dealers ==
Depending on the jurisdiction, the division uses different broker dealer subsidiaries of RBC:

- Canada: RBC Dominion Securities
- United States: RBC Capital Markets, LLC
- Europe: RBC Europe Limited (RBCEL)
- United Kingdom: RBC Europe Limited
- France: RBC Capital Markets (Europe) GmbH
- Germany: RBC Capital Markets (Europe) GmbH
- Spain: RBC Capital Markets (Europe) Maria de
- Switzerland: RBC Capital Markets (Europe) GmbH
- Netherlands: RBC Capital Markets Europe GmbH
- Japan: RBC Capital Markets (Japan) Ltd.
- Australia and Asia: Royal Bank of Canada (ARBN 076 940 880)

== See also ==
- List of banks and credit unions in Canada
- List of banks in the Americas
- List of largest banks
