= Frank Wilton Baillie =

Canadian industrialist

Sir Frank Wilton Baillie
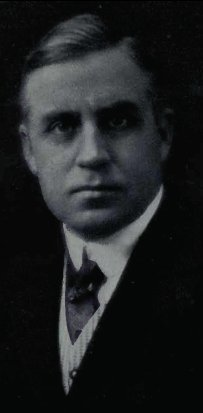
- Born: August 9, 1875; Toronto, Ontario, Canada
- Died: January 2, 1921 (aged 45); Toronto, Ontario, Canada
- Occupation(s): Financier and industrialist

Sir Frank Wilton Baillie, KBE (August 9, 1875 – January 2, 1921) was a Canadian financier and industrialist who played a significant role in establishing the modern steel industry in Canada.

In 1903, Baillie started up a brokerage firm, Baillie Brothers and Company (later Baillie, Wood, and Croft), which operated on the Toronto Stock Exchange. His partners were Frank Porter Wood (his neighbour on Crescent Road in Toronto) and his brother James W. Baillie.

During World War I, Baillie turned his attention to the production of military aeroplanes. In 1918, he was knighted for his contributions to the war effort, becoming the first Canadian to be made a Knight Commander of the Order of the British Empire.
