= Alfred Ernest Ames =

Canadian investment dealer (1866–1934)

- Born: 3 September 1866; Lambeth, Ontario
- Died: 20 September 1934 (aged 68); Toronto, Ontario
- Education: Brantford Collegiate Institute
- Spouse: Mary Louisa Cox (m. 1889)

Alfred Ernest Ames (3 September 1866 – 20 September 1934) was a Canadian investment dealer. Ames began his career as a banker in 1881 at age 15 and worked at various banks in Ontario for eight years. In 1889, Ames married the daughter of George Albertus Cox, and that same year moved to Toronto to work with his new father-in-law. Upon taking up residence in Toronto, Ames founded the investment brokerage A. E. Ames & Company. The Ames firm grew to become one of Canada's most important brokerages. The business merged with Dominion Securities in 1981 to form Dominion Securities Ames, which was the country's largest brokerage. Ames held executive roles with many of the financial companies controlled by Cox. Additionally, he was a prominent company director in Toronto and served terms as president of the Toronto Stock Exchange and Toronto Board of Trade. Ames died in Toronto in 1934 at age 68.

== Biography ==
Alfred Ernest Ames was born in the village of Lambeth, Ontario on 3 September 1866 to the Reverend William Ames (1820–1910) and Hephzibah Coleman Whitehouse (1823–1893). William, a Methodist minister, was born in Somerset, while Hephzibah was born in Staffordshire. Ames attended Brantford Collegiate Institute for two years and left school at age 15 after having completed his second-class certificate.

Ames began his career in September 1881 when he joined the Merchants Bank of Canada in Owen Sound. He remained with the bank until the end of 1882, and in January 1883 joined the Imperial Bank of Canada, where he had postings at branches in Toronto and Ingersoll. During his time in Ingersoll, Ames came down with a severe fever and took six-months' sick leave.

In 1885, when he was healthy again, the Ontario Bank offered Ames the position of acting accountant at its Peterborough branch. After two and a half years in Peterborough, in 1887 Ames was made manager of the bank's branch in Mount Forest. He remained in Mount Forest for 11 months and then was made manager of the Lindsay branch, where he worked during 1888 and 1889.

In 1889, Ames married Mary Louisa Cox (1868–1947), the daughter of George Albertus Cox. The marriage brought Ames into the inner circle of his father-in-law's financial network. In 1884, Cox had founded the Central Canada Loan and Savings Company in Peterborough, and in 1886 was elected a director of the Canadian Bank of Commerce. In 1888, Cox moved his operations from Peterborough to Toronto and set up offices at the corner of King and Victoria.

After the marriage, the Ameses moved to Toronto where Alfred joined his father-in-law's businesses. In December 1889, Ames established the brokerage A. E. Ames & Company, which was associated with Central Canada Loan and was guaranteed by the Bank of Commerce. Additionally, Cox gave control of two of his companies, Toronto Savings and Loan Company and the Provident Investment Company, to Ames. When Cox formed Imperial Life in 1896 and the National Trust Company in 1898, Ames was made a director of both. In 1903, a stock market drop nearly destroyed the brokerage. On 2 June 1903, Ames & Company suspended payments. Ames had large holdings in Dominion Steel that had been purchased a $70 a share and were now worth $15 a share. Reportedly, Ames lost $1 million, though ultimately his brokerage survived.

A. E. Ames & Company remained a major brokerage through most of the twentieth century. In 1981, the brokerage was acquired by Dominion Securities, which changed its name to Dominion Securities Ames subsequently. Following the takeover, DSA became the largest brokerage in Canada. In 1984, the Ames name disappeared after the firm acquired Pitfield Mackay Ross and changed its name to Dominion Securities Pitfield.

Besides his duties with his brokerage and the Cox companies, Ames served as president of the Toronto Stock Exchange for 1898–1899, and the Toronto Board of Trade for 1901–1902. Ames was president of the Metropolitan Bank of Toronto, which existed from 1902 to 1914 and was acquired by the Bank of Nova Scotia. He was a regent of Victoria University, a trustee of Massey Hall, and a member of Sherbourne Street Methodist, known colloquially as the "millionaires' church" for the numerous Cox-aligned financiers who were congregants. After 1925, Ames joined the United Church of Canada, as did all Methodists. He was a member of the Toronto Club, York Club, National Club, Lambton Golf and Country Club, and Caledon Mountain Trout Club. Ames served as a director of companies including Simpsons, Kelvinator of Canada, Sterling Coal, Toronto Brick, Russell Motor Car, American Sales Book, Brantford Cordage, Canada Life, City Dairy, Conger Lehigh Coal, Gilman Fanfold, International Milling, Twin City Rapid Transit, Willys-Overland of Canada, Page-Hersey Tubes, Pacific-Burt, and Moore Corporation.

Alfred and Mary had two children, Ethel Marguerite (1890–1927) and George Albertus (1895–1933). Both Ames children died young. Ethel died at age 37 from pregnancy complications, while George died at age 38 from wounds received in World War I. In 1890, Ames purchased "Glen Stewart," the former estate residence of the Rev. William Stewart Darling, rector of the Church of the Holy Trinity. The house, located today at 45 Glen Stewart Crescent, was built around 1873 and was designed by Frank Darling. Ames lived in the house until his death. Ames died at his home in Toronto on 20 September 1934 at age 68. On Saturday, 22 September, the funeral was held at his house, and was officiated by the Reverend Dr Robert Laird, treasurer of the United Church, who was assisted by the Reverend E. Harold Toye, minister of Kingston Road United Church, where Ames was a member. At the funeral, his friend of 35 years Samuel J. Moore, said of Ames, "he was one of Toronto's most outstanding and helpful citizens. A perfect Christian gentleman. A man of the highest integrity with a host of friends who will greatly regret that they will not meet him again." Ames was interred at Mount Pleasant Cemetery.
