= Portrait of a Seated Woman with a Handkerchief =

Painting attributed to Carel Fabritius

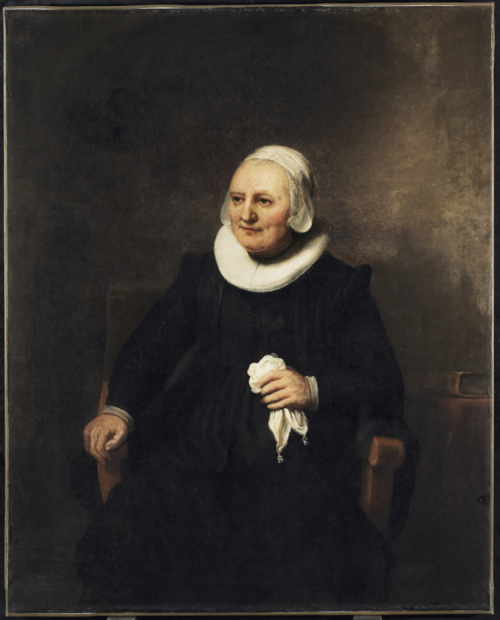
- Artist: Carel Fabritius (attributed)
- Year: c. 1644
- Medium: Oil on canvas
- Location: Art Gallery of Ontario; Toronto

Portrait of a Seated Woman with a Handkerchief is a painting at the Art Gallery of Ontario, in Toronto. Today it is attributed to Carel Fabritius, but was previously considered a work by Rembrandt.

The work was sold in 1845 as part of the auction of the collection of Joseph Cardinal Fesch. It was later in the collection of Sir George Holford of Dorchester House, London. It was sold alongside the rest of the collection at Christie's in 1928. While still attributed to Rembrandt it was bought at auction by the Eaton's corporation for 30,000 Guineas. The company displayed the portrait at their College Park store and later at stores in Montreal and Winnipeg; at the time the only Rembrandt on public display in Canada. It was later moved to one of the private rooms of the College Street building and was then given as a retirement present to R.Y. Eaton. He loaned the painting to the Art Gallery of Toronto and his widow donated it in 1966. In 1959, it was one of six works stolen from the gallery. The thieves targeted the most valuable works, also taking the Portrait of Isaak Abrahamsz. Massa and Rembrandt's Young Woman with a Lapdog. Then still believed to be a Rembrandt, Woman with a Handkerchief had the highest value of those stolen according to the gallery's insurance.

The painting is signed "Rembrandt f. 1644" and this signature was long accepted as valid. It is today known that there are many works with Rembrandt signatures that were faked. Some of these are works produced in Rembrandt's workshop, often following an initial sketch of Rembrandt's. Others are pure forgeries with the signature added at a later date to increase its value. The painting does date from the era of Rembrandt, and the date could be accurate. It is rejected as the hand of Rembrandt as the hands and face of the portrait are painted in a distinctive style, and a style very different from Rembrandt's. The style is similar to the surviving works of Carel Fabritius, one of Rembrandt's most skilled pupils. There is still considerable scholarly debate over whether the painting is truly one by Fabritius.

There has also long been speculation over the identity of the sitter. Aaltje van Uylenburgh, a cousin of Rembrandt's wife Saskia, is the most common conjecture. The pose of the sitter suggests the painting was paired with a portrait of the woman's husband. A painting known as Portrait of a Scholar is of the same size and general style. It today hangs in Cologne and is believed to depict J.C. Sylvius, van Uylenburgh's husband. The two paintings are also recorded as having been sold together in a sale in 1811.
