= McLeod Young Weir =

Canadian investment brokerage (1921–1988)

- Industry: Securities
- Founded: January 1921
- Defunct: 29 March 1988
- Fate: Acquired by the Bank of Nova Scotia
- Successor: ScotiaMcLeod Inc. (1988–99); Scotia Capital Inc. (1999–)
- Headquarters: Toronto, Ontario

McLeod, Young, Weir & Co. Limited, and after 1977, McLeod Young Weir Limited, was a Canadian investment brokerage that operated from 1921 to 1988. The firm grew to become one of the country's largest brokerage houses and provided services including underwriting, stock and bond trading and distributing, leasing, private placements, and mortgage financing. McLeod Young Weir had international offices in England, France, and the United States and owned seats on the Toronto, Montreal, Vancouver, Alberta, Winnipeg, and Midwest stock exchanges.

In 1987, the Ontario government amended its regulations to allow banks to own brokerages outright. Consequently, in 1988, the firm was acquired by the Bank of Nova Scotia for $419 million and renamed ScotiaMcLeod. In 1999, the firm was renamed Scotia Capital Inc., while the name ScotiaMcLeod was given to its retail brokerage division.

== History ==
McLeod, Young, Weir & Co. was founded in January 1921 by Donald Ivan McLeod (1886–1967), William Ewart Young (1886–1953), Lt-Col James Gordon Weir DSO MC (1888–1970), and John Henry Ratcliffe CBE (1894–1968). The four men were former employees of A. E. Ames & Company, the investment brokerage founded by Alfred Ernest Ames in 1889.

McLeod was from Owen Sound and graduated bachelor of arts from Queen's University in 1908. He worked as a journalist from 1908 to 1911, and that year went into the investment business with Brent, Noxon & Co. in Toronto. After serving in the war, he joined A. E. Ames in 1918.

Young was born in Scarborough and joined the Metropolitan Bank as a clerk in 1906. In 1909 he joined the Traders' Bank as an accountant, before leaving in 1911 to join Ames. By 1918, he had become the sales manager for the firm's bond department.

Weir was born in Flamborough, graduated bachelor of arts from the University of Toronto in 1908, and master of arts from Harvard University in 1909. He began working for the Financial Post in 1909 before joining Ames in 1910. He served with distinction in the war and returned to Ames in 1919. In World War II, his son, John Gordon Weir (1919–2009), was a prisoner of war in Stalag Luft III and participated in the events that inspired the film The Great Escape.

Ratcliffe was born in Atwood and finished high school in Listowel. He attended the University of Toronto, though he did not graduate. Ratcliffe joined Ames in Toronto in 1918.

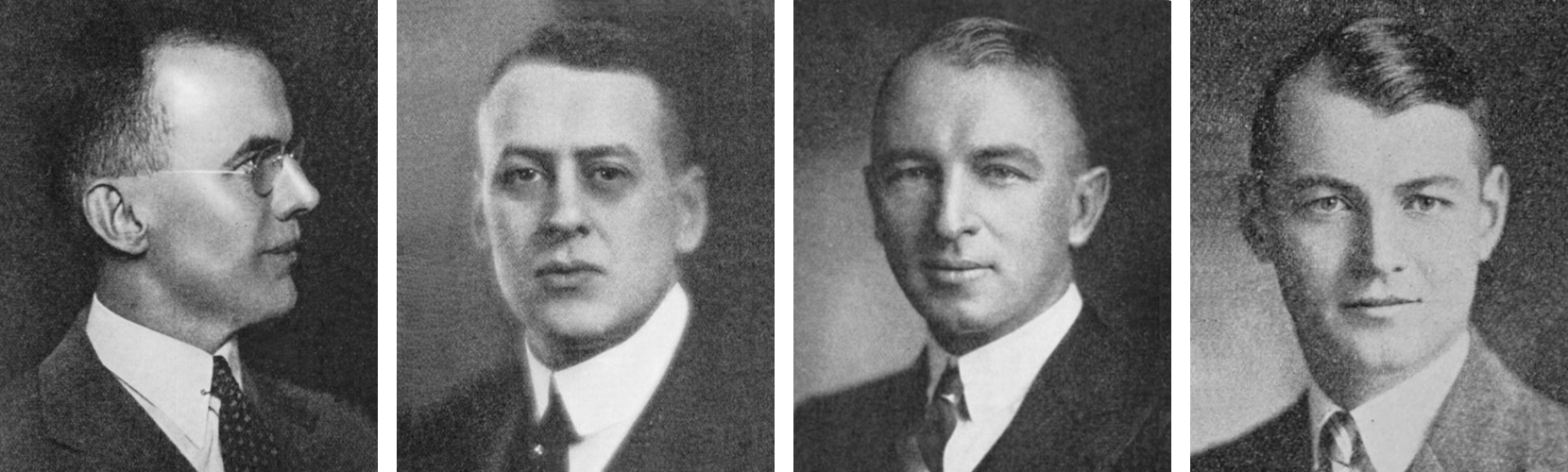
The founders, from left to right: McLeod, Young, Weir, and Ratcliffe.

In 1928, the group formed an associated stock brokerage called McLeod, Young, Harris & Scott Limited along with Goodwin Read Harris (1900–1951) and William Robert Scott (1881–1956). The firm became a member of the Toronto Stock Exchange. In July 1933, the firm changed its name to McLeod, Young & Scott, at which time Reginald Case became associated with the company. When Scott retired in February 1940, the partners dissolved the firm and formed a new partnership called McLeod, Young, Weir & Ratcliffe.

In the 1970s, McLeod Young Weir floor trader Trevor Raymond Dixon (1947–2024) wanted the other MYW traders to be more easily identifiable on the floor. He came up with the idea for the company's traders to wear jackets made from the yellow tartan of Clan McLeod. The idea was approved by chairman Austin Taylor. They day the jackets were introduced, the McLeod traders paraded into the stock exchange led by a bagpiper.

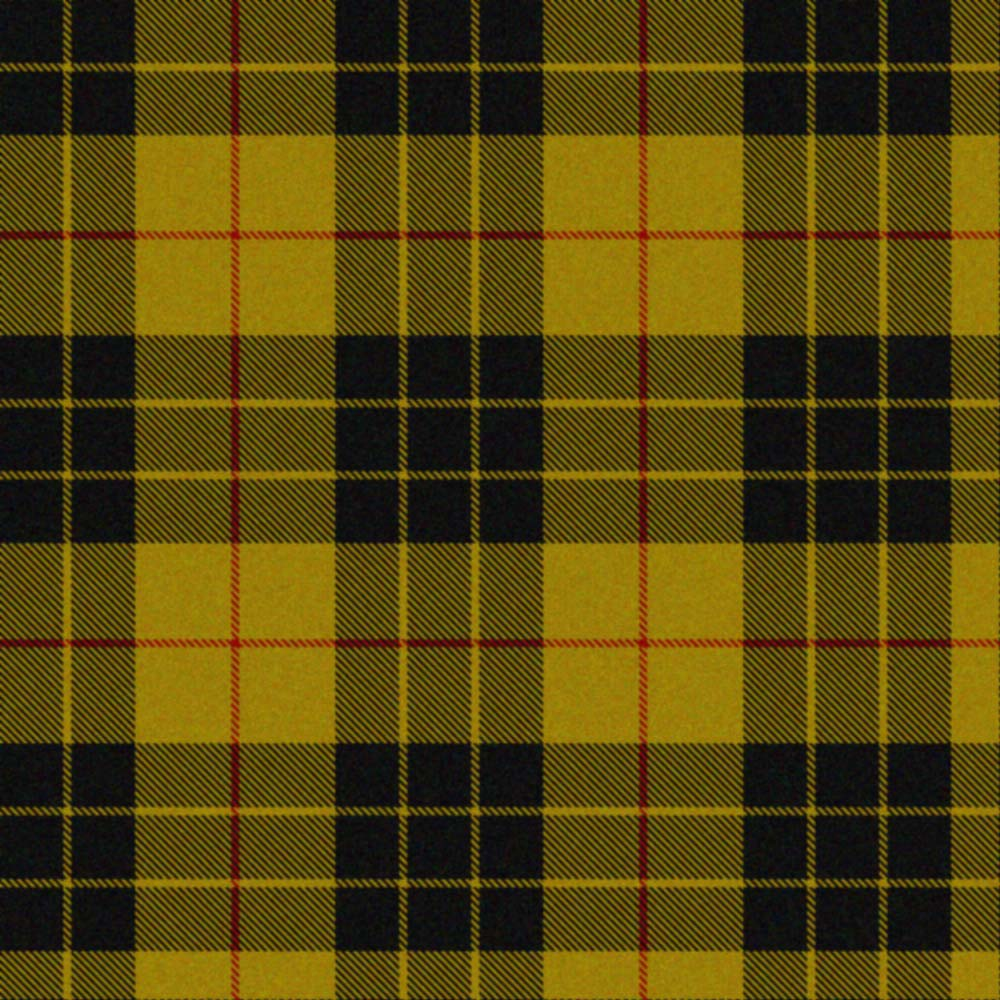
The company's floor traders wore jackets made from Clan McLeod tartan.

Effective 1 June 1987, the Ontario government amended its regulations to allow banks to acquire 100 per cent ownership of investment brokerages. This deregulation set of a string of acquisitions that saw all of Canada's large brokerages come under the control of banks. In the late 1980s, McLeod Young Weir was the fifth largest investment brokerage in the country. Rumours began to circulate in September 1987 that the Bank of Nova Scotia was interested in buying McLeod. At the time, 30 per cent of McLeod was owned by Shearson Lehman Brothers and 20 per cent was owned by the Bronfman family. The remaining 50 per cent of shares were owned by the company's employees. On 1 October, the intent to purchase became public knowledge. Scotia would be the third bank to acquire a brokerage, following the purchase by the Canadian Imperial Bank of Commerce of Wood Gundy, and the purchase by the Bank of Montreal of Nesbitt, Thomson. The original offer was for $483 million, though in December it was reduced to $419 million. The bank's acquisition of McLeod concluded on Tuesday, 29 March 1988. In June, the firm announced that it had been renamed ScotiaMcLeod Inc.

In 1999, the bank renamed the business Scotia Capital Inc. Since that time, the name ScotiaMcLeod has been used for Scotia Capital's retail brokerage division.
