= Edward Rogers Wood =

Canadian financier (1866–1941)

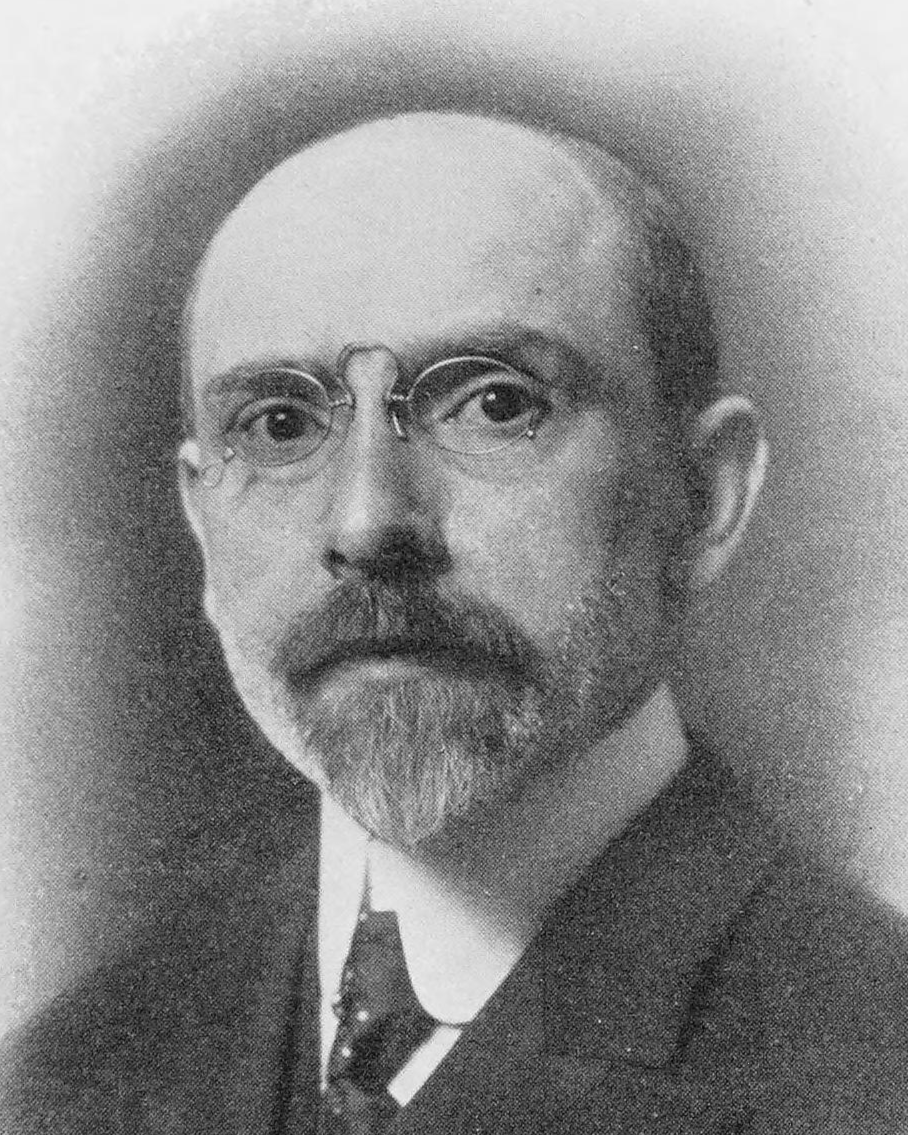
- Born: 14 May 1866; Peterborough, Ontario
- Died: 16 June 1941 (aged 75); Toronto, Ontario
- Spouse: Agnes Euphemia Smart (m. 1891)

Edward Rogers Wood (14 May 1866 – 16 June 1941) was a prominent financier in Canadian business. He was notable for his role in the development of the Brazilian Traction, Light and Power Company Limited (later Brascan Limited, then amalgamated into Brookfield Asset Management) and for his links with the "Peterborough Methodist Mafia" of George Albertus Cox.

== Life and career ==
Wood was born in Peterborough, Canada West to a Northern Irish father (John W. Wood) and a Scottish mother (Jane Porter). He married Agnes Euphemia Smart in Toronto on July 18, 1891. They had a son, William (nicknamed Wy – died at six months), and a daughter, Mildred.

In his early teens, Wood joined the Great North Western Telegraph Company owned by Peterborough's mayor, George Albertus Cox (later a member of the Senate of Canada). After completing school, Wood joined Cox's financial firm, the Central Canada Loan & Savings Company. In 1898, both men incorporated the National Trust Company in Toronto. National Trust became part of the Bank of Nova Scotia as Scotia Trust in 1997.

In 1901, Cox and Wood formed Dominion Securities (now part of the Royal Bank of Canada) with the purpose of underwriting and retailing provincial, municipal, and utility bonds. In 1902, Wood shifted Dominion Securities into industrial finance by financing Dominion Iron & Steel and Dominion Coal. In 1910, he formed Dominion Steel Corporation, where his younger brother Frank Porter Wood was a president. He was at that time a leading financier and also became active in philanthropy, as well as in volunteer endeavours for the University of Toronto, Toronto General Hospital, Art Gallery of Ontario and the YMCA.

== Wood family residences ==
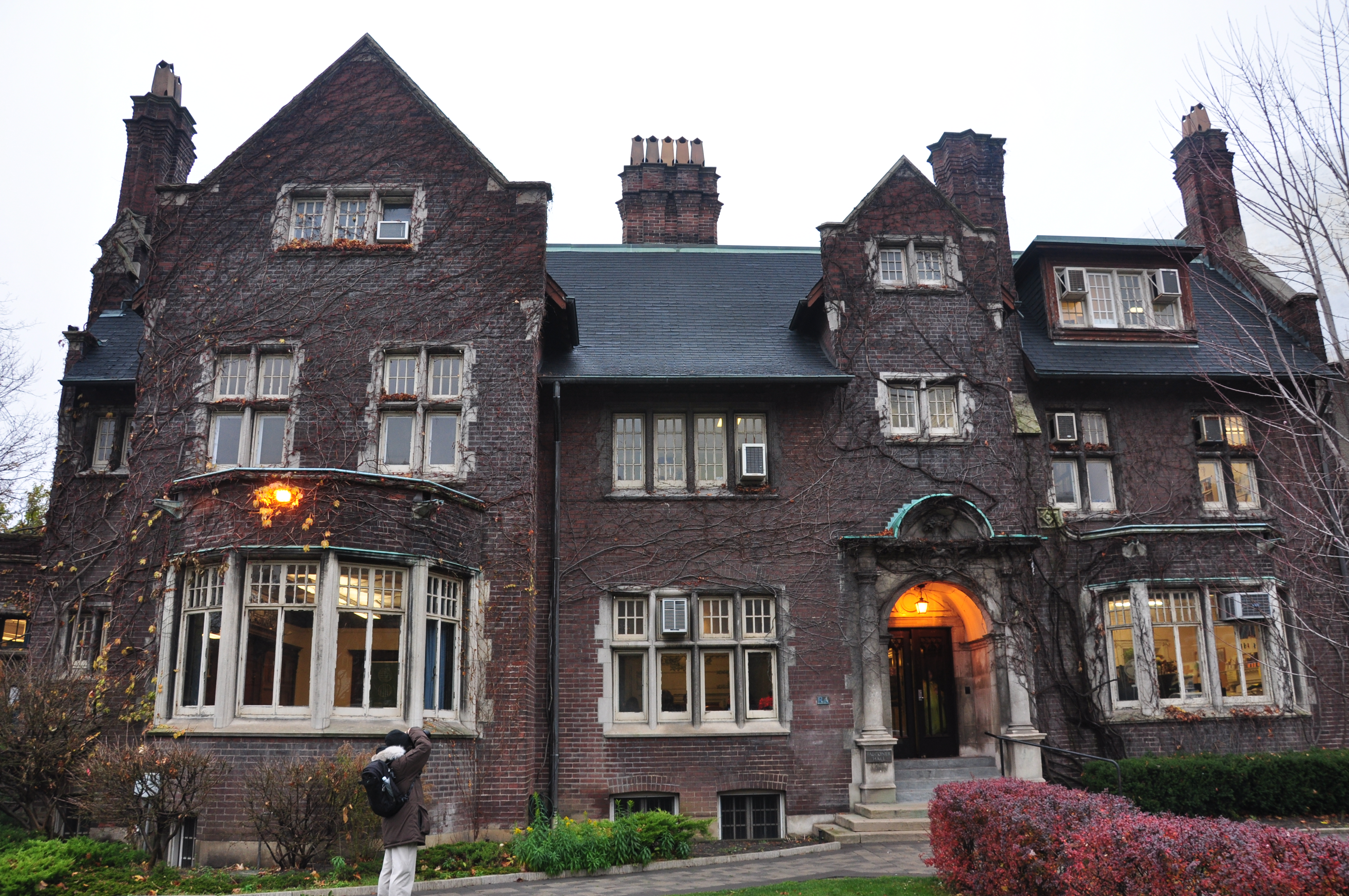
Wymilwood, now Falconer Hall

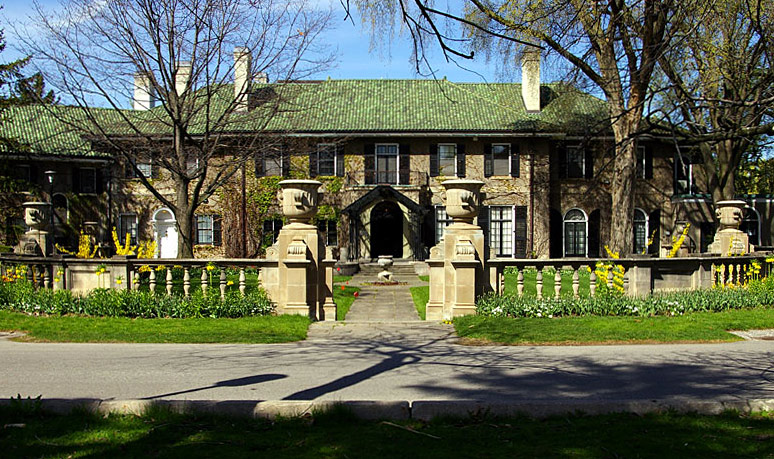
Glendon Hall, the final residence of Edward Wood

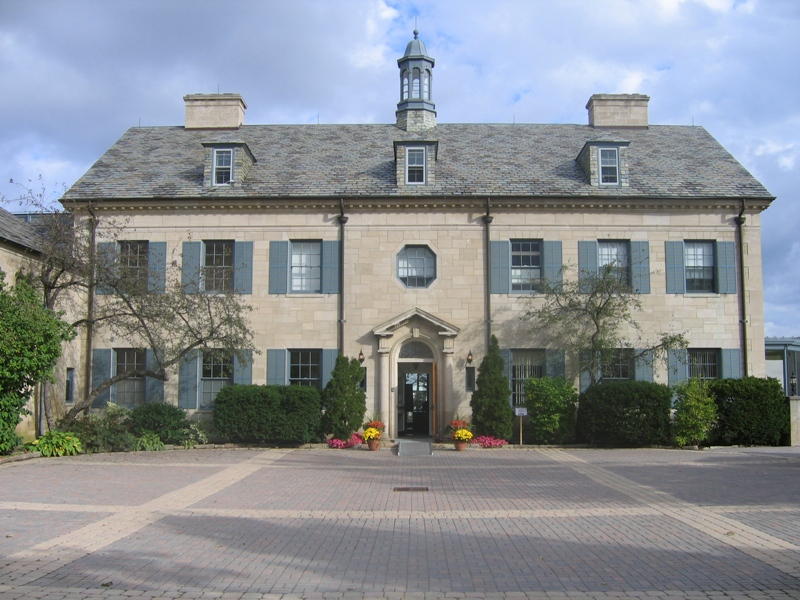
The home of Frank P. Wood on Bayview Avenue, north of Glendon Hall

Edward and Euphemia "Pheme" Wood built and lived in Wymilwood (named for their children, Wy and Mildred) at 84 Queen's Park from 1902 to 1924. They donated Wymilwood, an Elizabethan style mansion now called Falconer Hall, to the University of Toronto, and it is now part of the University of Toronto Faculty of Law.

From 1920 to 1924, they planned, built and moved to Glendon Hall on Bayview Avenue. Wood's younger brother Frank P. Wood and his wife Emma later built an estate nearby that is now occupied by Crescent School.

In 1950, by then a widow, Pheme Wood died and bequeathed Glendon Hall to the University of Toronto, with the intent that it be used by the Department of Botany for a university (not a public) botanical garden. Following ten years of mixed academic use, the university turned over the estate in 1961 to its newly created affiliate, York University.

Edward Wood died in Toronto in 1941. He and his wife are buried in Mount Pleasant Cemetery, Toronto, adjacent to the grave of George Albertus Cox.
