= Equity capital markets =

Equity capital markets (ECM) are markets where equity capital is raised, bought and sold by investors and speculators. The major types of equity capital are unlisted equity, listed equity and hybrids, each are traded in different ways. The market consists of venture capital firms, private equity firms, development banks, investment banks and stock exchanges.

Equity capital market practitioners, traditionally advise on a full range of equity, debt equity-linked, hybrid, asset-backed, credit-linked and derivative products that are offered in capital markets.

In an equity capital market (ECM) financial institutions help companies raise funds for growth and development. The financial institutions involved are usually investment banks. Institutions providing ECM services may be involved in initial public offerings (IPO), convertible bonds, and other services involving equity. They may also raise money for a company merge or acquisition of another company. There was a peak in the amount of profits generated through ECM activities in 2006–2007, but profits declined following those years.

In corporate finance, Equity Capital Market is an investment banking activity consisting in advising companies, also referred to as issuers, to raise equity on capital markets. ECM consists in preparing the equity issues, from designing the equity story and marketing materials of the proposed transaction to placing the underlying equity securities to institutional and retail investors through an adequate marketing strategy. Equity securities placed by an ECM desk can range from common shares to convertible bonds into shares, the latter sometimes designed as Equity-Linked Capital Market.
