= National Trust Company =

Canadian trust company

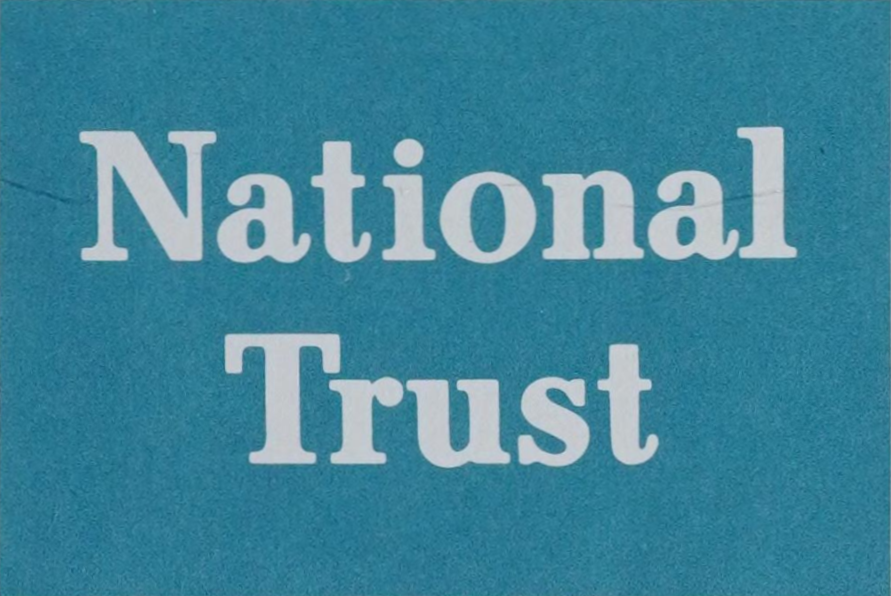
- Industry: Trust company
- Founded: 12 August 1898
- Headquarters: 1 Ontario Street, Stratford, Ontario
- Parent: Bank of Nova Scotia (1997–present)

The National Trust Company is a Canadian trust company that has existed since 1898. The company was formed by George Albertus Cox and originally was part of a network of financial companies he controlled. In its first year of operations the company opened an office in Montreal, and in its second year it expanded to Western Canada through the acquisition of the Manitoba Trust Company. National Trust played an important role in the development of the west through the issuance of farm mortgages. For the first half-century of its life, National Trust was primarily a fiduciary operation and acted as a trustee for major concerns such as the Canadian Northern Railway, Brazilian Traction, and Barcelona Traction. After the onset of the Great Depression, the company struggled for the next two decades.

In the early 1950s, National Trust expanded beyond its fiduciary operations and developed a deposit and savings arm. Over the next three decades, the company opened 50 satellite branches and grew its deposits from $27 million in 1947 to $3 billion in 1983. In 1984, National Trust merged with the Victoria and Grey Trust Company; the new merged company was owned by V&G's holding company, which assumed the name National Trustco. In 1991, the Bank Act was amended to allow bank holding companies to own trust companies, which hitherto had been prohibited. Consequently, in 1997, the Bank of Nova Scotia acquired National Trustco for $1.25 billion. Since that time, National Trust has been a subsidiary of the bank.

== History ==
=== The Cox financial network, 1861–1898 ===
The origins of the National Trust Company trace to 1861, when George Albertus Cox entered the financial services industry. Cox was born on 7 May 1840 in Colborne, Ontario. In 1856 he began working for the Montreal Telegraph Company in his hometown, before the company appointed him its agent in Peterborough in 1858. In 1861, Cox joined Canada Life and opened a new branch in Peterborough, which a short time later was doing over half the company's business. In 1878, Cox became president of the Midland Railway of Canada, which he saved and in 1883 leased to the Grand Trunk Railway. Cox used the profits from his railway interests to form the Central Canada Loan and Savings Company in 1884. In 1886, he was elected a director of the Canadian Bank of Commerce.

In 1888, Cox moved to Toronto and set of Central Canada's offices at the northwest corner of King Street and Victoria Street. In 1889, his daughter Mary Louisa married Alfred Ernest Ames, who that year established the investment brokerage A. E. Ames & Company, which worked in tandem with Cox's concerns and was guaranteed by the Bank of Commerce. Additionally, Cox gave Ames control of two of his smaller companies, the Toronto Savings and Loan Company and the Provident Investment Company. Cox had invested heavily in the Bank of Commerce and by 1890 owned two percent of the company's shares; that same year he was appointed president. By the early 1890s Cox had gained effective control of Canada Life, and in 1892 was elected a director. By the end of the decade he held nearly half the company's shares and in 1899 initiated the transfer of the company's headquarters from Hamilton to Toronto. The following year, he was elected president of Canada Life, holding the office until his death in 1914.

Cox was involved in the insurance industry as president of British America Assurance and Western Assurance, and through the formation in 1896 of Imperial Life by his allies. For a brief time in the late 1890s he gained control of Manufacturers Life and Temperance and General Life from the Gooderham family, though they regained control not long after.

=== Formation and growth of National Trust ===
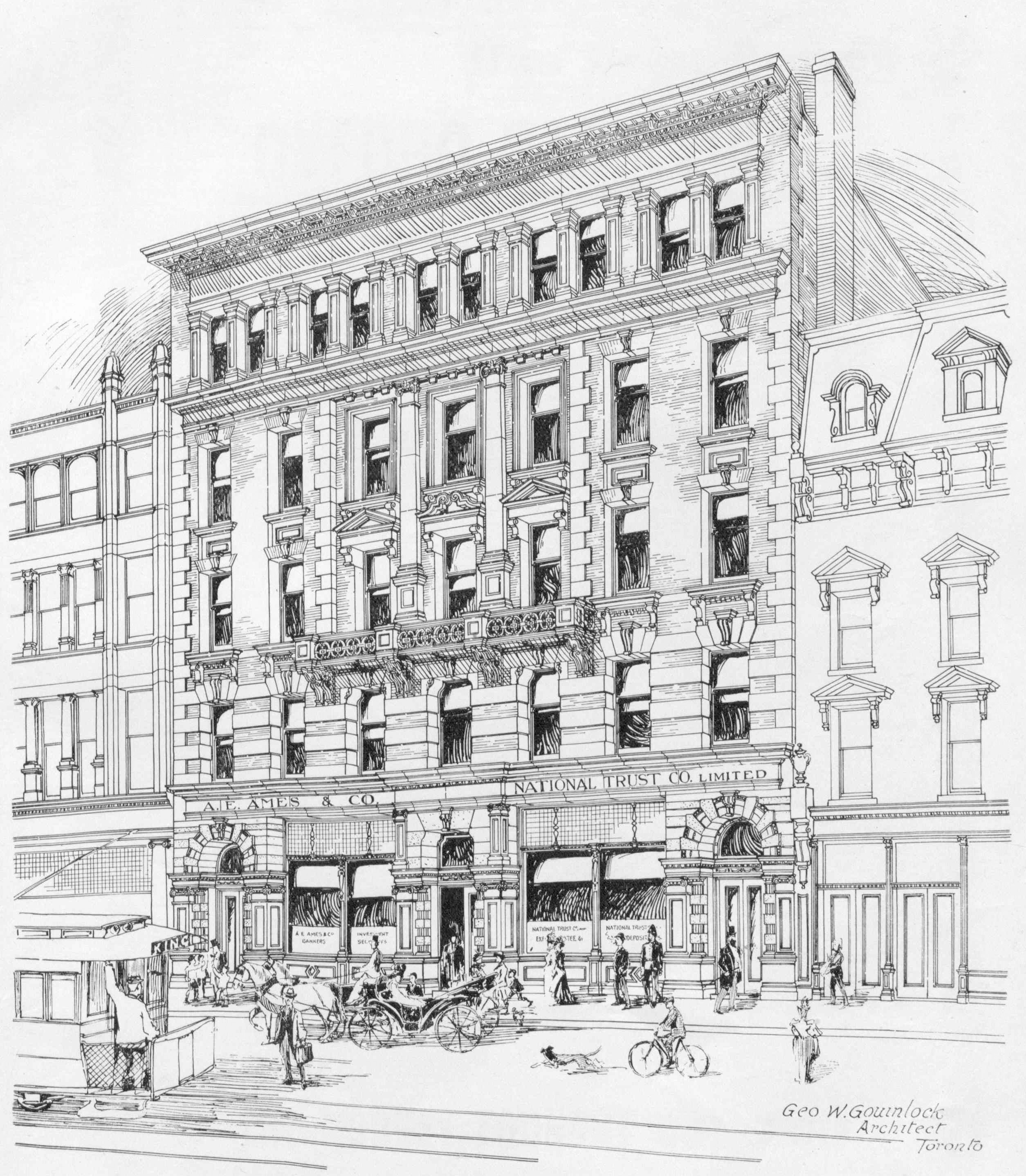
The company's 1900 headquarters at 20 King East, designed by George Wallace Gouinlock.

By the late 1890s, the Cox network had interests in banking, mortgages, brokerage, and insurance. His next project was to build a company to operate in the novel area of trusteeship. On 12 August 1898 as the National Trust Company of Ontario, Limited was incorporated by letters patent under the Ontario Companies Act. National Life's shares were held primarily by companies under Cox's control, including Canada Life, Central Canada Savings and Loan, the Canadian Bank of Commerce, and Toronto Loan and Savings. National Trust opened for business on 24 August 1898 at 26 King Street, the headquarters of Central Canada Savings. The first board of 18 directors comprised Sir Joseph Wesley Flavelle, Zebulon Aiton Lash, Edward Rogers Wood, Justice Hugh MacMahon, George Albertus Cox, George Hughes Watson, Elias Rogers, Robert Kilgour, Frederick William Gates, Edward William Cox, Harris Henry Fudger, Sir Edward Kemp, William Mackenzie, Alfred Ernest Ames, Walter Edward Hart Massey, Byron Moffatt Britton, and Frederic Thomas Nicholls. The first president was Cox's nominee, Flavelle; the first vice-president was A. E. Ames; and the interim general manager was Edward Rogers Wood. Along with Wood, the other four members of the original staff were C. O. Merson, James Watt, Herbert Morley Asling, and A. D. Morrow.

On 1 February 1899, after just over four months of operations, the company held its first annual meeting. Also in 1899, National Trust opened its Montreal office. That year, William Marcellus O'Connor, who would become president in 1946, joined the company. On 21 September 1899, by order-in-council it changed its name to the National Trust Company, Limited.

In 1900, National acquired the Manitoba Trust Company in Winnipeg, which gave the company its first western office. This was followed by an Edmonton office in 1902, a Saskatoon office in 1905, and a Regina office in 1911. William Thomas White was appointed general manager in 1902, while Wood was appointed vice-president. White left the company in 1911 to take a cabinet position in the government of Robert Borden, and was succeeded as general manager by William E. Rundle. The company's founder George Cox, died on 16 January 1914 at age 73. He appointed the company as his executor, and upon his death, his son Herbert Coplin Cox was elected to the board.

During World War I, 53 men from National Trust served in the military, 9 of whom were killed in action. Among those killed was Percival Molson, the manager of the Montreal office. While he was serving as federal finance minister, W. T. White created Canada's income tax. White returned to National Trust in 1919 as a director.

The new National Trust Building at 21 King Street East opened on 10 December 1962. It was designed by Page and Steele.

In March 1961, National Trust announced that it would be the primary tenant in the new office building being built by Welport Investments Ltd at the corner of King and Victoria, and that it had received the naming rights to the building. The 22-storey office tower was designed by Page and Steele and upon its completion was the third-tallest building in Toronto. The new National Trust Building at 21 King Street East opened on Monday, 10 December 1962.

=== Amalgamation with Victoria and Grey, 1984–1997 ===
In 1984, National Trust merged with the Victoria and Grey Trust Company to form the National Victoria and Grey Trust Company. To execute the merger, all shares of National Trust were transferred to V&G's holding company, the Victoria and Grey Trustco. In June 1985, National Victoria and Grey Trust Company changed its name to the National Trust Company, and in 1989 the holding company changed its name to National Trustco.

=== Subsidiary of the Bank of Nova Scotia, 1997–present ===
In August 1997, the Bank of Nova Scotia acquired National Trustco for $1.25 billion. Today, National Trust remains an operating subsidiary of the bank. Its registered office is 1 Ontario Street in Stratford, the former headquarters of the British Mortgage and Trust Company, which was acquired by Victoria and Grey in 1965.

== Leadership ==
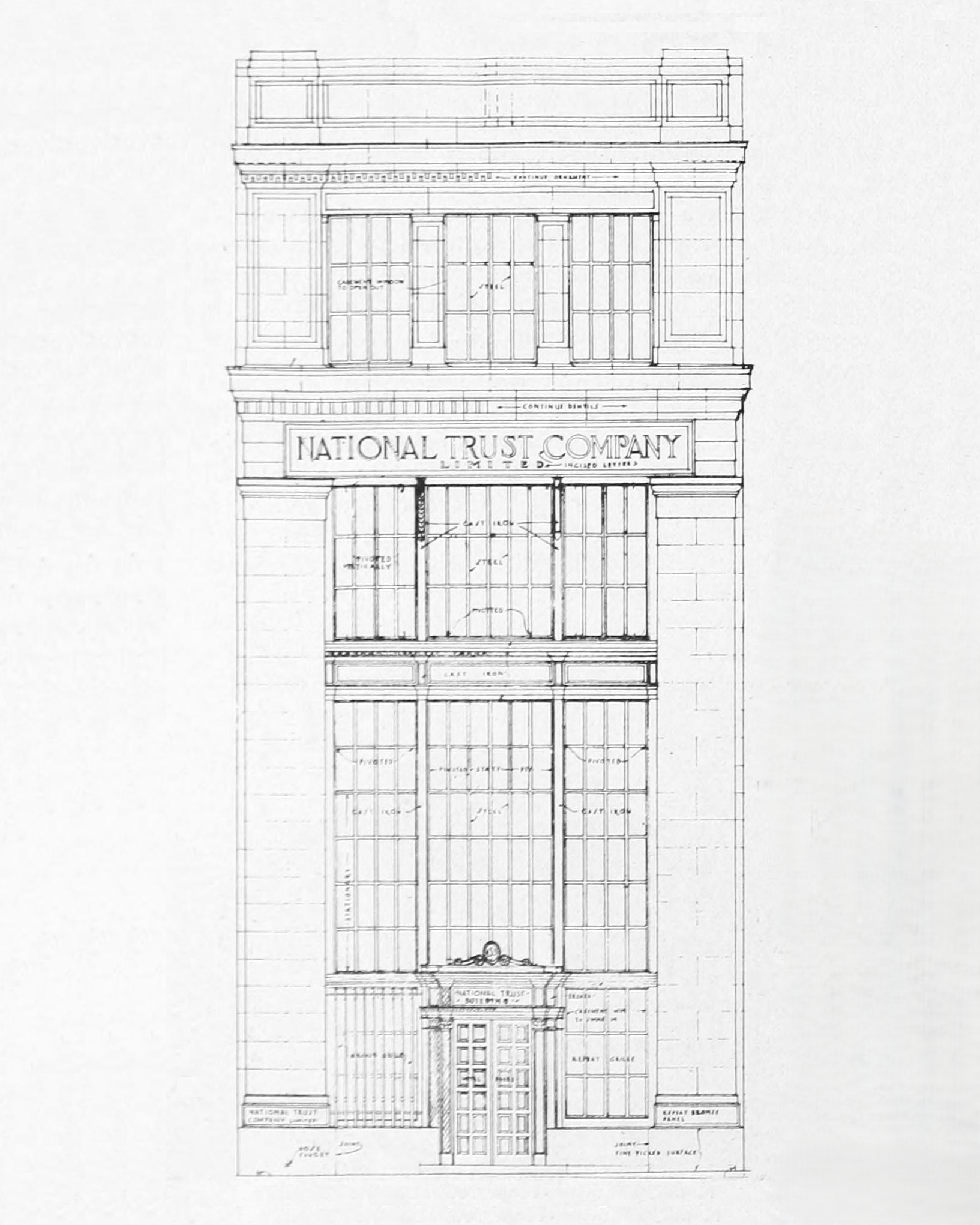
The 1914 office at 225 St James Street in Montreal, designed by Kenneth Guscotte Rea.

=== President ===
1. Sir Joseph Wesley Flavelle, 1898–1931
2. William Edward Rundle, 1931–1939
3. James MacKerras Macdonnell, 1939–1944
4. Leighton Goldie McCarthy, 1944–1946
5. William Marcellus O'Connor, 1946–1950
6. Robert Alexander Laidlaw, 1950–1954
7. John Girdlestone Hungerford, 1954–1964
8. Henry Holcombe Wilson, 1964–1967
9. Edwin Henry Atcheason Heeney, 1967–1972
10. James Leslie Alexander Colhoun, 1974–1977
11. John Christopher Counsel Wansbrough, 1977–
12. Bryan Victor Mehlenbacher
13. Michael J. White, 1995–

=== Chairman of the board ===
1. Sir Joseph Wesley Flavelle, 1931–1939
2. Leighton Goldie McCarthy, 1940–1950
3. William Marcellus O'Connor, 1950–1951
4. Robert Alexander Laidlaw, 1951–1964
5. John Girdlestone Hungerford, 1964–1972
6. Edwin Henry Atcheason Heeney, 1972–1977
7. James Leslie Alexander Colhoun, 1977–1984
8. William Henry Somerville, 1984–1989
9. Henry Newton Rowell Jackman, 1989–1991
10. John Christopher Counsel Wansbrough, 1991–
11. Paul Cantor, 1995–
