= TD Bank (disambiguation) =

The Toronto-Dominion Bank (TD Bank) is a financial services group based in Canada.

TD Bank may also refer to:

- TD Canada Trust, based in Toronto, Ontario, TD Bank's Canadian retail banking division
- TD Bank, N.A. based in Cherry Hill, New Jersey, TD Bank's American retail banking division
