= J. Allan Boyle =

Canadian banker (1916–2008)

J. Allan Boyle AFC OC
- Born: 10 May 1916; Orillia, Ontario
- Died: 5 December 2008 (aged 92); Toronto, Ontario
- Education: Orillia Collegiate Institute ('34)
- Spouse: Doris Sydney Mullett (m. 1941)
- Military career
- Allegiance: Canada
- Branch: Royal Canadian Air Force
- Service years: 1940–1945
- Rank: Squadron Leader
- Service number: J6226
- Conflicts: World War II

John Allan "Ben" Boyle AFC OC (10 May 1916 – 5 December 2008) was a Canadian banker who served as president of the Toronto-Dominion Bank from 1978 to 1981. Boyle joined the Dominion Bank in 1934 in his hometown of Orillia as a junior clerk. After serving in the Royal Canadian Air Force in World War II, Boyle rejoined the Dominion Bank and in 1948 was sent to its Manhattan branch. Following the Dominion's merger with the Bank of Toronto in 1955, in 1956 Boyle was sent back to the States to work at the new bank's New York branch. Boyle returned to Canada in 1966 and joined the head office in Toronto. In 1972 he was appointed chief general manager and vice-president, and in 1974 was elected a director. On 1 May 1978, Boyle succeeded Richard Murray Thomson as the bank's president, while Thomson was appointed chairman and chief executive. Boyle retired in 1981 at age 65 but remained a director of the bank until 1987. He died in Toronto in 2008 at age 92.

== Biography ==
John Allan Boyle was born on 10 May 1916 in Orillia, Ontario to William John Boyle (1880–1941) and Mary Innes MacKenzie (1881–1932). He had two older sisters, Jean (1909–2014) and Mary (1912–1961). Boyle's Scottish mother called him "bonnie bairn," meaning roughly "beautiful child." The term was corrupted to "Ben," which became his nickname. Boyle graduated from Orillia Collegiate Institute in June 1934, and that August joined the Dominion Bank as a junior clerk.

Boyle left the bank in 1940 and joined the Royal Canadian Air Force. After receiving his wings, he was made a pilot instructor in the British Commonwealth Air Training Plan. On 8 June 1944, while attached to No. 2 Service Flying Training School at RCAF Uplands in Ottawa, Boyle was awarded the Air Force Cross. The award was part of the 1944 Birthday Honours. Boyle was sent to England in 1944 to serve as an instructor in a heavy conversion unit. In July 1944, Boyle flew on a bombing raid over Europe and had his plane shot down. He was captured on 7 July and interned at Stalag Luft III as POW no. 6936. In early 1945, the prisoners in the camp were transferred to Stalag XIII-D. After being liberated, on 13 May 1945 he returned to England, and on 26 May was presented his AFC.

In late 1945, Boyle rejoined the Dominion Bank. In 1948, he was sent to New York, where he worked in the bank's Manhattan branch for three years before returning to Canada. On 1 February 1955, the Dominion Bank merged with the Bank of Toronto to form the new Toronto-Dominion Bank. In June 1956, TD sent Boyle back to New York where he served as a Special Representative, and in 1964 he was appointed an Agent. During the decade he worked in New York, the Boyles lived in New Jersey, and Ben commuted to Manhattan by train. Boyle returned to Canada in January 1966 and joined the head office in Toronto. The following month, he was appointed Assistant General Manager, International Division. In July 1968 he was appointed General Manager, Administration, and in December 1968 was appointed Deputy Chief General Manager. In September 1972 he was appointed Executive Vice-president and Chief General Manager, and in September 1974 was elected to the board of directors. At an unknown date, Boyle attended the Management Training Course at the University of Western Ontario. On 1 May 1978, Boyle was appointed president of the bank. He succeeded Richard Murray Thomson, who replaced Allen Thomas Lambert as chairman and chief executive.

During his tenure as president, Boyle oversaw the bank's expansion in the United States and Britain, and the introduction of bank credit cards. Boyle retired from the presidency on 31 May 1981 at age 65, and was succeeded in the position by Robert Willem Korthals. Boyle remained a director of the bank until 1987. He served also as a director of Excelsior Life, Aetna Casualty, Costain Limited, and Jannock Limited, and was a governor of York University.

Boyle served as president of the Canadian Bankers Association for the 1974–75 term, and served a term as president of the Canadian Club of Toronto. He was a member of the Thornhill Country Club, Toronto Club, Granite Club, York Club, Canadian Club of New York, and Sara Bay Country Club. The Boyles were members of the United Church of Canada.

On 31 May 1941, Boyle married Doris Sydney Mullett (1916–1995), whom he had known since childhood. The wedding took place in Toronto at the home of Doris's brother-in-law, Stanley A. Watson, and the service was officiated by the Rev. Fred Smith, the minister of Silverthorn United Church. Ben and Doris had two children, William and Charlotte. He died on Friday, 5 December 2008 in Toronto at age 92. The funeral was held on 10 December at the A. W. Miles Chapel of the Humphrey Funeral Home. He was interred with his late wife at the St. Andrews and St. James Cemetery in Orillia.
