= Robert Willem Korthals =

Canadian banker (1933–2023)

- Born: 7 June 1933; Maracaibo, Venezuela
- Died: 28 October 2023 (aged 90); Toronto, Ontario
- Education: Ridley College ('50); University of Toronto (BASc 1955); Harvard University (MBA 1961)
- Occupation: Banker
- Known for: Former president of the Toronto-Dominion Bank
- Spouse(s): Judy Korthals (divorced), Janet Charlton (m. 2011)
- Children: 3

Robert Willem "Robin" Korthals (7 June 1933 – 28 October 2023) was a Canadian banker who served as president of the Toronto-Dominion Bank from 1981 to 1995.

Korthals joined Toronto-Dominion in 1967 and rose quickly through the ranks, becoming a vice-president in 1972 and an executive vice-president in 1978. In 1981, Korthals succeeded J. Allan Boyle to become the bank's fifth president. He remained in the post for 14 years and retired at the end of January 1995.

== Early life and education ==
Robert Willem Korthals was born on 7 June 1933 in Maracaibo, Venezuela, to Leendert Willem Korthals and Beatrice Stella Campbell Moir. Leendert was from Dordrecht, while Beatrice was from Maybole. Korthals was raised in Curaçao. He came to Canada in 1946 to attend Ridley College in St. Catharines, graduating in 1950. He then attended the University of Toronto, where he studied chemical engineering and graduated in 1955. In 1961, he earned a Master of Business Administration from Harvard University.

== Career ==
Korthals began his career in the investment business. In July 1967, Korthals joined the Toronto-Dominion Bank as Superintendent, Term Financing. In November 1968, he became Superintendent of the National Accounts Division, and in February 1972, its General Manager. Korthals was appointed Vice-president, Administration in September 1972, Senior Vice-president in November 1976, and Executive Vice-president and Chief General Manager in May 1978.

On 1 June 1981, Korthals succeeded J. Allan Boyle to become the bank's fifth president. In September 1994, the bank announced that Korthals would retire on 31 January 1995, and would be succeeded as president by A. Charles Baillie. Following his retirement, Korthals joined the Ontario Securities Commission part-time as a commissioner. In May 1995, Korthals was elected chairman of North American Life. He held the office until the company's takeover by Manulife at the end of that year.

== Personal life ==
Korthals was married to Judy. They had three children: Jamie, Lisa (1968–2018), and Chris (1971–2011). His daughter Lisa, a renowned skier in British Columbia, was killed in an avalanche. They later divorced. He remarried in 2001 to Janet Charlton. Korthals died at Belmont House in Toronto on Sunday, 28 October 2023 at age 90.
