= Eunice Bélidor =

Canadian curator of contemporary art (born 1987

- Born: 1987; Montreal
- Education: BA degree in art history at Concordia University; M.A in Art History & Visual Culture from York University
- Known for: curator
- Website: https://www.eunicebee.net/

Eunice Bélidor (born 1987) is a Canadian curator of contemporary art, writer and researcher.

== Early life and education ==
Born in Montreal to Haitian immigrant parents, Bélidor completed a BA degree in art history at Concordia University. She later received an M.A in Art History & Visual Culture from York University.

== Career ==
Bélidor was the emerging curator and programming coordinator at Articule Gallery, Montreal, from 2014 to 2019. Following this, she held the position of director of the FOFA gallery at Concordia University. In 2021 she was appointed the curator of Quebec and Canadian Contemporary Art at the Montreal Museum of Fine Arts. Bélidor was the first black curator in the museum's history. She resigned from the museum in January 2023 and has since spoken about the difficulties of being the museum's first black curator and being a "Black Lives Matter hire".

In 2018 she received the TD Bank Group award for emerging curator.
