= Bharat Masrani =

Canadian businessman

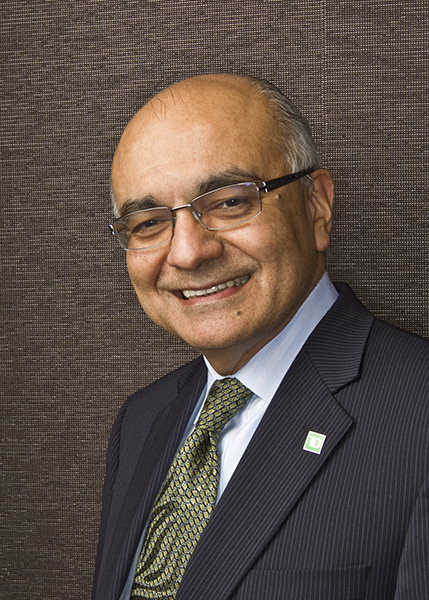
- Bharat Masrani in 2012
- Born: 1955 or 1956 (age 70–71); Uganda
- Education: Schulich School of Business
- Occupations: Group president and chief executive officer of Toronto-Dominion Bank (also known as TD Bank Group)

Bharat Masrani (born 1955 or 1956) is a Canadian financial executive who served as the group president and chief executive officer of the Toronto-Dominion Bank (also known as TD Bank Group) from November 2014 until his retirement on February 1, 2025.

== Early life and education ==
Masrani is of Indian descent and was raised Hindu. He is of Gujarati descent. He was born in Uganda, a country from which his family fled in 1972. Masrani graduated with Honours from York University in 1978 with a Bachelor of Administrative Studies. He earned his Master of Business Administration from the Schulich School of Business, York University in 1979. He was awarded an honorary degree from the Schulich School of Business in 2017 and an honorary doctorate from Mount Allison University in 2018.

== Banking career ==
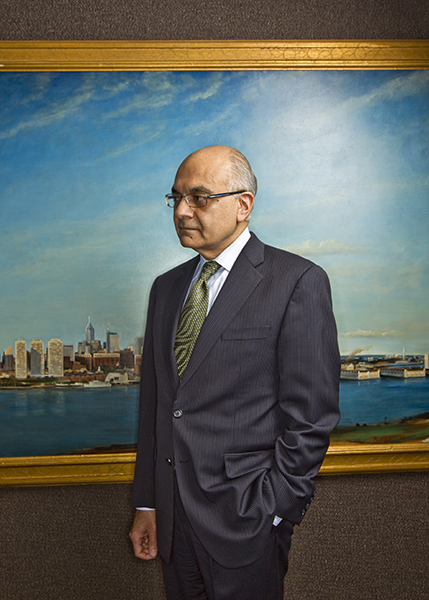
Bharat Masrani in 2012

Masrani started his banking career in 1987 as a Commercial Lending Trainee at TD. Over the course of three decades, he went on to hold many senior executive roles across the bank, working in four different countries. In 1993, he was appointed Head of Corporate Banking in Canada. Two years later, Masrani relocated to Mumbai, India where he set up TD's first office in that country. In 1999, Masrani moved to London, England to lead TD's discount brokerage business TD Waterhouse in the UK as Senior Vice President.

Masrani returned to Toronto in 2003 as Vice Chair and Chief Risk Officer of TD Bank Group.

When TD expanded into the US with the acquisition of Banknorth in 2006, he moved to Portland as President of TD Banknorth. A year later, Masrani became President and Chief Executive Officer, TD Banknorth. In 2008, TD acquired Commerce Bancorp and integrated TD Banknorth to become TD Bank, N.A. Masrani became Group Head, US Personal and Commercial Banking and CEO of TD Bank, N.A.

When President and CEO W. Edmund Clark announced his upcoming retirement, this led to a succession planning contest between Masrani, Mike Pedersen (Group Head of Wealth, Insurance, and Corporate Office), and Tim Hockey (Group Head of Canadian Personal and Commercial Banking, as President and CEO of TD Canada Trust). In July 2013, Masrani was named chief operating officer and CEO-designate of TD, and became president and CEO of TD on November 1, 2014 upon Clark's retirement.

In 2018, Masrani was the highest-paid Big 5 bank CEO with $15.3 million in total compensation. In 2023, he took a pay cut due to U.S. regulatory issues and the bank's termination of its First Horizon acquisition.

In 2024, under Masrani's leadership, TD Bank became the largest bank in U.S. history to plead guilty to violating money laundering prevention laws, and agreed to pay over $3 billion in penalties to resolve the charges. A statement from TD Bank claimed, "We have taken full responsibility for the failures of our U.S. AML program and are making the investments, changes and enhancements required to deliver on our commitments. This is a difficult chapter in our Bank's history. These failures took place on my watch as CEO and I apologize to all our stakeholders," Bharat Masrani, Group President and Chief Executive Officer, TD Bank Group.

Masrani announced his retirement from TD in September 2024, with plans to step down as CEO the following April and continue advising TD until October 2025.

It was announced on January 17, 2025 that his retirement plans will be accelerated to take place on February 1st, 2025, with Raymond Chun being appointed to Group President and Chief Executive Officer (CEO) that day.
