= Mercantile Bank =

Mercantile Bank may refer to:

- Mercantile Bank (Bangladesh), a bank founded in Dhaka in 1999
- Mercantile Bank (South Africa), a bank founded in Sandown, Johannesburg in 1965
- Mercantile Bank, now TD Bank, a Florida subsidiary of South Financial Group
- Mercantile Bank of India, London and China, a British bank founded in 1853, acquired by HSBC in 1959

== See also ==
- Mercantile Bancorporation, a holding company in Missouri, acquired by Firstar Corporation in 1999
- Mercantile Bankshares, a Maryland company acquired by PNC Financial Services in 2007
- Mercantile Discount Bank, a commercial bank in Israel
