= Hudson United Bank =

Bank in New Jersey

Hudson United Bancorp
- Industry: Bank holding company
- Founded: 1890
- Defunct: 2006
- Fate: Acquired by TD Banknorth
- Successor: TD Banknorth (now TD Bank, N.A.)
- Headquarters: Mahwah, New Jersey
- Key people: Kenneth T Neilson
- Products: Financial services
- Website: www.hudsonunitedbank.com

Hudson United Bank (HUB) is a bank which is part of the Nondepository Credit Intermediation Industry. It used to be headquartered in Mahwah, New Jersey. It has locations in New Jersey, Pennsylvania, New York, and Connecticut. Hudson United Bank has 1,280 total employees across all of its locations. There are 2,879 companies in the Hudson United Bank corporate family. HUB was acquired by TD Banknorth (now TD Bank, N.A.) in 2006.

== History ==
Hudson United Bank was founded in 1890. During the 1990s, it had acquired numerous regional banks, including Jefferson National Bank (1995), Growth Bank (1996), Middletown Savings Bank (1998), and many others.

== Acquisition by TD Banknorth ==
In July 2005, TD Banknorth agreed that it would buy HUB. The acquisition was finalized on January 31, 2006, and all HUB locations were converted to TD Banknorth. Today, most of the former HUB locations, including those taken over by regional banks, are now part of TD Bank, N.A.
