= South Financial Group =

The South Financial Group
- Type: Public
- Traded as: NASDAQ: TSFG
- Industry: Financial services
- Founded: 1986
- Fate: Acquired by Toronto-Dominion Bank
- Headquarters: Greenville, South Carolina, United States
- Key people: A. Foster McKissick; Mack I. Whittle, Jr., Founders; H. Lynn Harton, President & CEO
- Products: Asset management Commercial banking Online banking Retail banking
- Number of employees: 2,473
- Website: www.thesouthgroup.com

The South Financial Group (originally known as Carolina First Corporation) was a bank holding company headquartered in Greenville, South Carolina. The South Financial Group was the parent company of Carolina First, with branch locations in North and South Carolina and Mercantile Bank, with branch locations in Florida.

The South Financial Group began posting heavy losses in 2008 and lost more than $1.7 billion before its sale in 2010 to TD Bank Financial Group of Toronto, Ontario, Canada. It lost more than $735 million alone during 2009, and another $400 million through the first six months of 2010. In May 2010, pending shareholder and regulatory approvals, it was announced that TD Bank, N.A., which is co-headquartered in Cherry Hill, New Jersey, and Portland, Maine, planned to acquire the troubled company. TD Bank is a subsidiary of Toronto-Dominion Bank based in Toronto, Ontario, Canada. A lawsuit was filed by a group of company shareholders against The South Financial Group, its board of directors and TD Bank in conjunction with the proposed sale. The suit was ultimately settled, clearing the way for the sale.

Between 2007 and 2010, South Financial's stock fell from more than $25 a share to less than $1 during this tumultuous period. Over its last five-plus years, South Financial saw its stock lose 99 percent of its value. In December 2008, South Financial received $347 million from the federal government as part of Troubled Asset Relief Program. At the end of April 2010, Carolina First entered into a consent order with the Federal Deposit Insurance Corporation (FDIC) and the Federal Reserve Bank of Richmond that sets time frames during which the bank must improve its capital position or risk being taken over by federal regulators. As part of the deal for South Financial the U.S. Treasury received $131 million.

On Sept, 28, 2010, The South Financial Group shareholders approved the merger of the company with TD Bank Financial Group. As of October 1, 2010 Carolina First and Mercantile Bank now operate as trade names of TD Bank, N.A. Both Mercantile Bank and Carolina First subsequently began operating under the TD Bank name in June 2011 following the completion of the planned system integration. Until such time both banks names will remain unchanged and be advertised in all markets as being "trade names of TD Bank, N.A."

== History ==
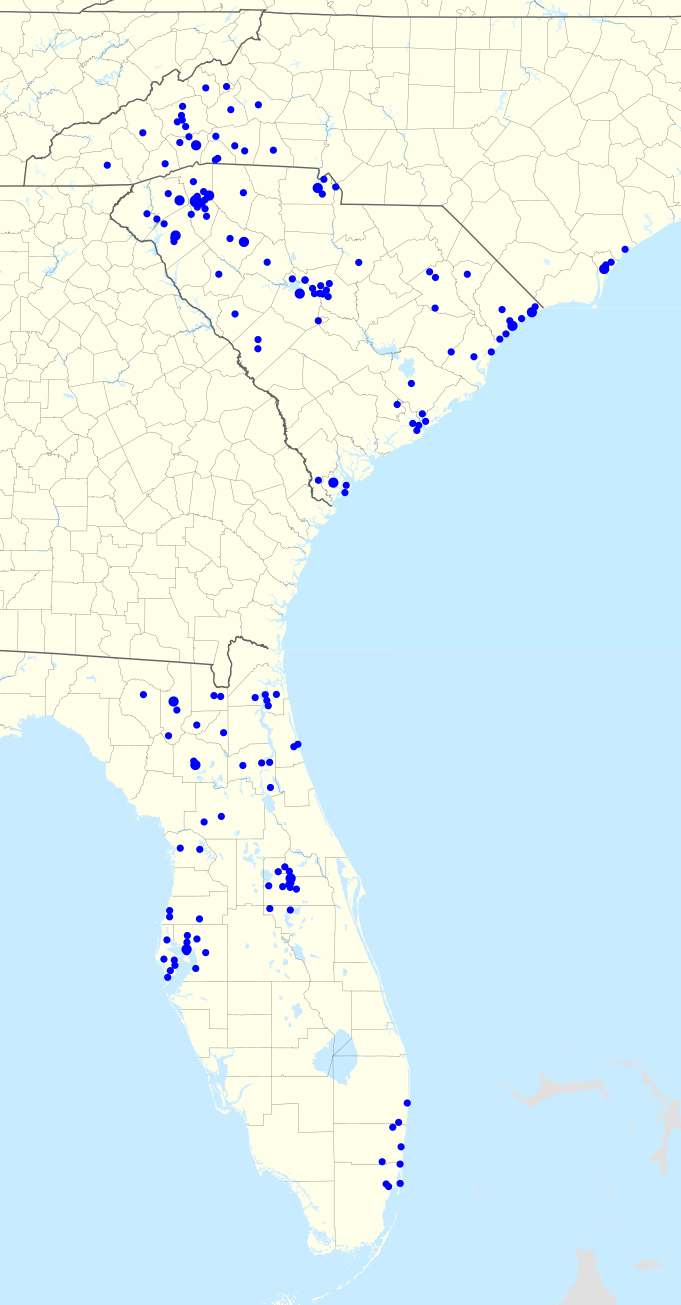
Map of Carolina First branches.

- 1986 – began as the Carolina First Bank
- 1994 – acquired Citadel Federal Savings Bank of Charleston, South Carolina
- 1995 – acquired Carolina First Savings Bank F.S.B. of Georgetown, South Carolina, Aiken County National Bank of Aiken, South Carolina, and Midlands National Bank of Prosperity, South Carolina
- 1999 – acquired Citizens Bank, NA of Shawano, Wisconsin
- 1997 – acquired Lowcountry Savings Bank of Mount Pleasant, South Carolina and First Federal Savings and Loan of Anderson, South Carolina
- 1998 – acquired First National Bank of Pickens County of Easley, South Carolina and Colonial Bank of South Carolina of Camden, South Carolina
- 2000 – acquired The Anchor Bank of Myrtle Beach, South Carolina and Carolina First Bank of Travelers Rest, South Carolina
- 2002 – acquired Rock Hill Bank & Trust of Rock Hill, South Carolina
- 2002 – acquired Gulf West Banks, Inc. for $115 million.
- 2003 – acquired MountainBank of Hendersonville, North Carolina
- 2008 – acquired 5 branches of BankAtlantic of Orlando, Florida
- 2010 – The South Financial Group acquired by TD Bank Financial Group
- 2011 - TD Bank Financial Group plans to integrate all systems and change bank names of Carolina First & Mercantile Bank to TD Bank on June 13, 2011.

== Subsidiaries ==
The South Financial Group operated three wholly owned subsidiaries: Mercantile Bank of Florida, Carolina First in North Carolina and South Carolina, and Bank CaroLine, an Internet bank. All three brands functioned as subsidiaries of Carolina First, which had approximately $12 billion in assets.

== See also ==
- Mercantile Bank (disambiguation)
- TD Banknorth
- Toronto-Dominion Bank
