= TD Canada Trust =

Canadian commercial bank

- Type: Division
- Industry: Financial services
- Founded: 2000; 26 years ago
- Headquarters: Toronto, Ontario, Canada
- Number of locations: Approximately 1,100 branches, and 2,600 ATMs
- Area served: Canada
- Key people: Raymond Chun (CEO of TD Bank Group)
- Services: Banking
- Revenue: ▲CA$43.6 billion; CA$41.1 billion
- Parent: TD Bank Group
- Website: www.td.com/ca/en/personal-banking

TD Canada Trust, commonly shortened in marketing to simply TD, is the Canadian commercial banking division of the multinational TD Bank Group. (Note: "TD Canada Trust" is a trade name of the Toronto-Dominion Bank (the head company of the TD Bank Group) and some of its subsidiaries, and is not a separate corporate entity in its own right.) Legally, "TD Canada Trust" is a trade name used by the Toronto-Dominion Bank and its Canadian subsidiaries, and is not a standalone company. It is the second-largest commercial bank in Canada by assets, behind only the Royal Bank of Canada. TD Canada Trust offers a range of financial services and products to more than 10 million Canadian customers through more than 1,100 branches and 2,600 ATMs.

In addition to the countrywide network of TD branches and ATMs in Canada, the bank has a network of mobile mortgage specialists, financial planners, private bankers, investment advisors, and portfolio managers and contributes a significant portion of TD Bank Group's overall revenues and earnings.

The current TD Canada Trust division was formed after TD's acquisition of Canada Trust in 2000; prior to this merger, the institution's retail operations were branded TD Bank. All new and most existing accounts are officially issued by Toronto-Dominion Bank (institution number: 004), although Canada Trust (institution number: 509) remains a separate subsidiary entity, and it remains the issuer of accounts opened at that institution prior to the merger.

The parent company, TD Bank Group, is a multinational financial services corporation headquartered in Toronto, Ontario, created on 1 February 1955, through the merger of The Bank of Toronto (founded 1855) and The Dominion Bank (founded 1869). In addition to its extensive Canadian retail operations, TD Bank Group has a major presence in the United States, where it operates as TD Bank, America's Most Convenient Bank®, and provides global wholesale banking services through its TD Securities division.

Since 2012, TD has been phasing out the "Canada Trust" part of its name from its logo online, in advertisements, and on stationery.

TD Canada Trust is known for its customer-centric approach, such as extended branch hours and high-ranking digital banking platforms, and has consistently been recognized for customer satisfaction and digital innovation. TD Canada Trust's history is marked by expansion through mergers and acquisitions, the introduction of new technologies (like online banking and mobile apps), and an emphasis on community involvement.

== History ==
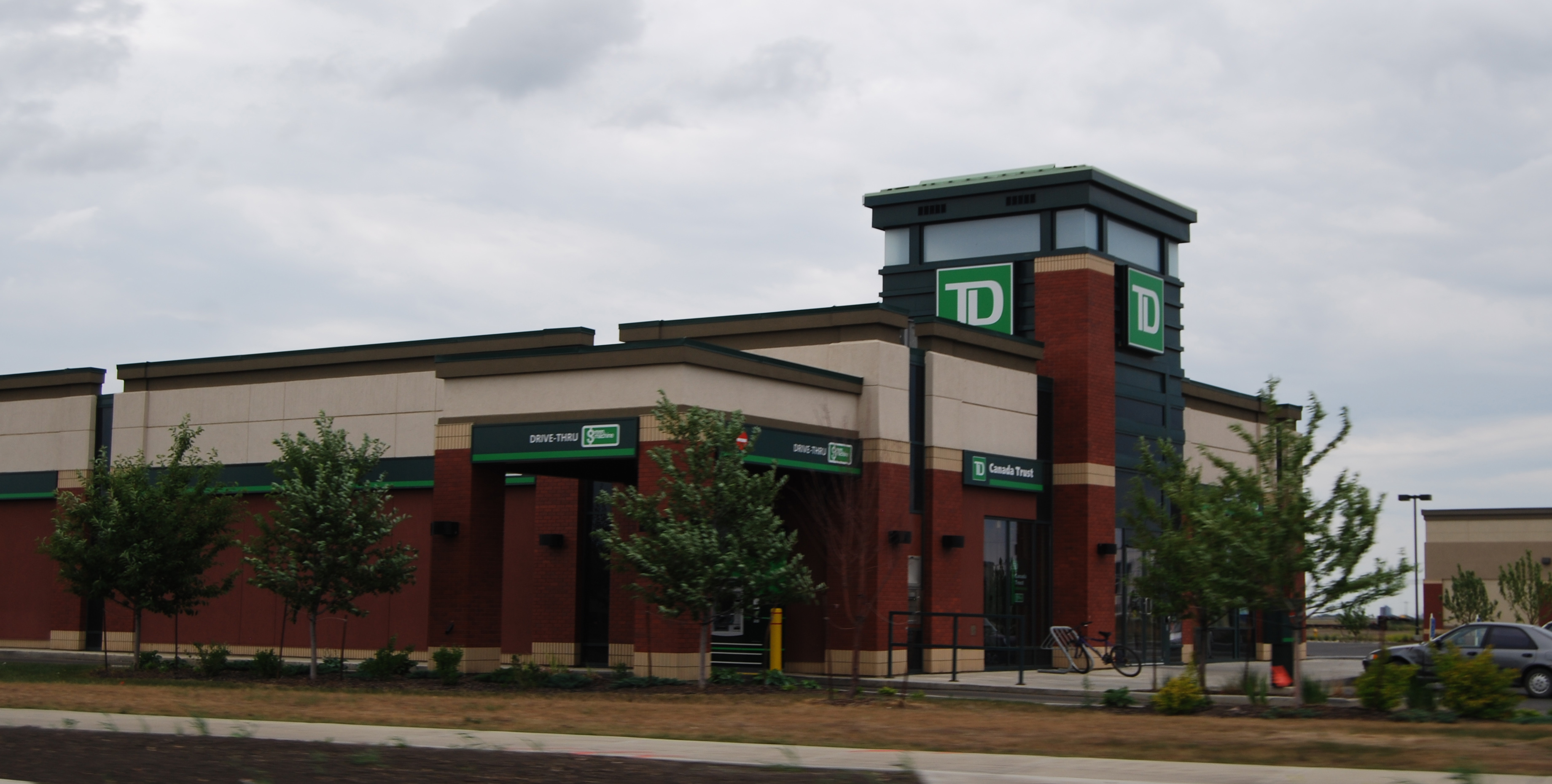
TD Canada Trust branch in Edmonton, Alberta

=== Origins and formation ===
The modern identity of TD Canada Trust is a composite of three major Canadian financial institutions: The Bank of Toronto, The Dominion Bank, and Canada Trust. Its character was shaped by two pivotal mergers—the first in 1955, creating the Toronto-Dominion Bank, and the second in 2000, which integrated Canada Trust and fundamentally reshaped the bank's retail identity. This history reflects a strategic fusion of a traditional, conservative chartered bank with an agile, customer-focused trust company, a combination that has defined both its market success and its subsequent challenges.

=== Predecessor institutions ===
==== Formation of Toronto-Dominion Bank (1955) ====
By the mid-1950s, both The Bank of Toronto and The Dominion Bank were established national institutions, but were smaller than their main competitors. To achieve the scale necessary to compete more effectively with the larger Canadian banks, the two institutions agreed to merge. The amalgamation was approved by Canada's Minister of Finance on 1 November 1954, and became official on 1 February 1955.

The newly formed entity was named The Toronto-Dominion Bank. At its inception, it operated 449 branches across Canada, maintained offices in London and New York, and employed approximately 4,700 people.

==== Canada Trust ====
Canada Trust traces its origins to the Huron and Erie Savings and Loan Society, which was founded in London, Ontario, in 1864 to provide mortgages funded by savings deposits. The entity that would become Canada Trust began as the General Trust Corporation of Canada, incorporated in Calgary in 1894. In 1899, this largely inactive corporation was acquired by the Huron and Erie Savings and Loan Society, which moved its headquarters to London, Ontario, and renamed it The Canada Trust Company.

Canada Trust officially began operations as a subsidiary of Huron & Erie in 1901. Over the following decades, it grew into one of Canada's largest and most popular trust companies. It distinguished itself from traditional banks by cultivating a customer-centric service model, famously offering extended branch hours under the slogan "Eight to Eight, Six Days Straight." This focus on convenience and accessibility helped it build a loyal customer base. By the late 1990s, Canada Trust was a dominant force in Canadian finance, with 3.5 million customers, over 400 branches, and $38 billion in deposits.

==== Acquisition of Canada Trust (2000) ====
In January 2000, TD Bank announced an agreement to acquire Canada Trust for approximately C$8 billion, aiming to significantly expand its personal and small business banking scale. The acquisition was completed on 1 February 2000, and over the course of 2000–2001, TD merged Canada Trust's operations with its own, rebranding the combined retail network as "TD Canada Trust" by 2001. As part of the integration, TD adopted Canada Trust's customer service model – notably its longer branch hours – across the merged network. Prior to the merger, Canada Trust had differentiated itself by offering extended banking hours (including evenings and Saturdays), and TD Canada Trust continued this approach, eventually advertising its promise of being "open earlier, open later, open longer" than competitors. By November 2007, over 800 TD Canada Trust branches opened from 8 a.m. to 8 p.m. on weekdays and 8 a.m. to 4 p.m. on Saturdays, giving TD the longest hours in Canadian banking.

The integration process included significant branch consolidation. In markets where TD and Canada Trust had overlapping presence, some branches were closed or divested to satisfy competition concerns. The federal Competition Bureau required TD to sell 13 branches (with over 120,000 customer accounts) in Ontario communities where concentration would have been especially high (notably in the Kitchener-Waterloo area), and to divest Canada Trust's Mastercard portfolio (since TD was an exclusive Visa issuer at the time) Most of the affected branches were sold to the Bank of Montreal, and TD also closed a number of other nearby branches to eliminate duplication. W. Edmund Clark, the CEO of Canada Trust, joined TD's executive team during the merger – initially as president of TD Canada Trust and COO of TD Bank – and later became CEO of TD Bank Group in 2002, helping to guide the successful integration of Canada Trust's operations and culture into TD.

=== Expansion and developments (2000s–2010s) ===
After the formation of TD Canada Trust, the bank pursued further growth in Canadian retail banking through both acquisitions and new initiatives. In 2001, TD Canada Trust absorbed the remaining branches of Central Guaranty Trust and other small institutions that TD had acquired in the 1990s. TD also continued to expand its branch network organically: for example, it opened 31 new branches in 2006 and over 30 in 2007, reaching about 1,100 branches nationwide by the 2010s.

Throughout the 2000s, TD Canada Trust invested heavily in technology and digital channels. Canada Trust had been an early adopter of internet banking with its launch of the EasyWeb online platform in 1999, and after the merger, TD continued to enhance EasyWeb as a leading online banking service in Canada, winning awards for online functionality in the mid-2000s.

In 2010, TD Canada Trust launched one of Canada's first full-service mobile banking apps, initially for iOS and BlackBerry (later for Android), allowing customers to perform most banking transactions via smartphone.

In the credit card business, TD made a major acquisition in 2011. On 1 December 2011, TD Bank Group completed the purchase of the Canadian credit card portfolio of MBNA, a large MasterCard issuer, from Bank of America. This deal added millions of MasterCard accounts to TD's customer base and instantly made TD one of the largest credit card issuers in Canada. TD continued to issue many MBNA credit card products under the MBNA brand as a division of TD, particularly affinity and co-branded Mastercard, even as its mainline TD cards remained Visa.

In 2012, the bank introduced a "Visa Debit" enabled client card (the TD Access Card) with Interac Flash, enabling online purchases and contactless payments directly from chequing accounts through the Visa network – a first for a major Canadian bank. These innovations helped TD attract tech-savvy customers and reinforced its "Convenience" brand promise.

In 2013, TD won a competitive bid to become the primary issuer of Aeroplan-branded Visa credit cards, replacing CIBC as Aeroplan's main bank partner. As part of that agreement, TD acquired approximately 50% of CIBC's Aerogold VISA portfolio (representing about 550,000 accounts) in December 2013. The Aeroplan cards transition in early 2014 further bolstered TD's credit card market share and introduced a large number of new clients to the bank's fold.

== Operations ==
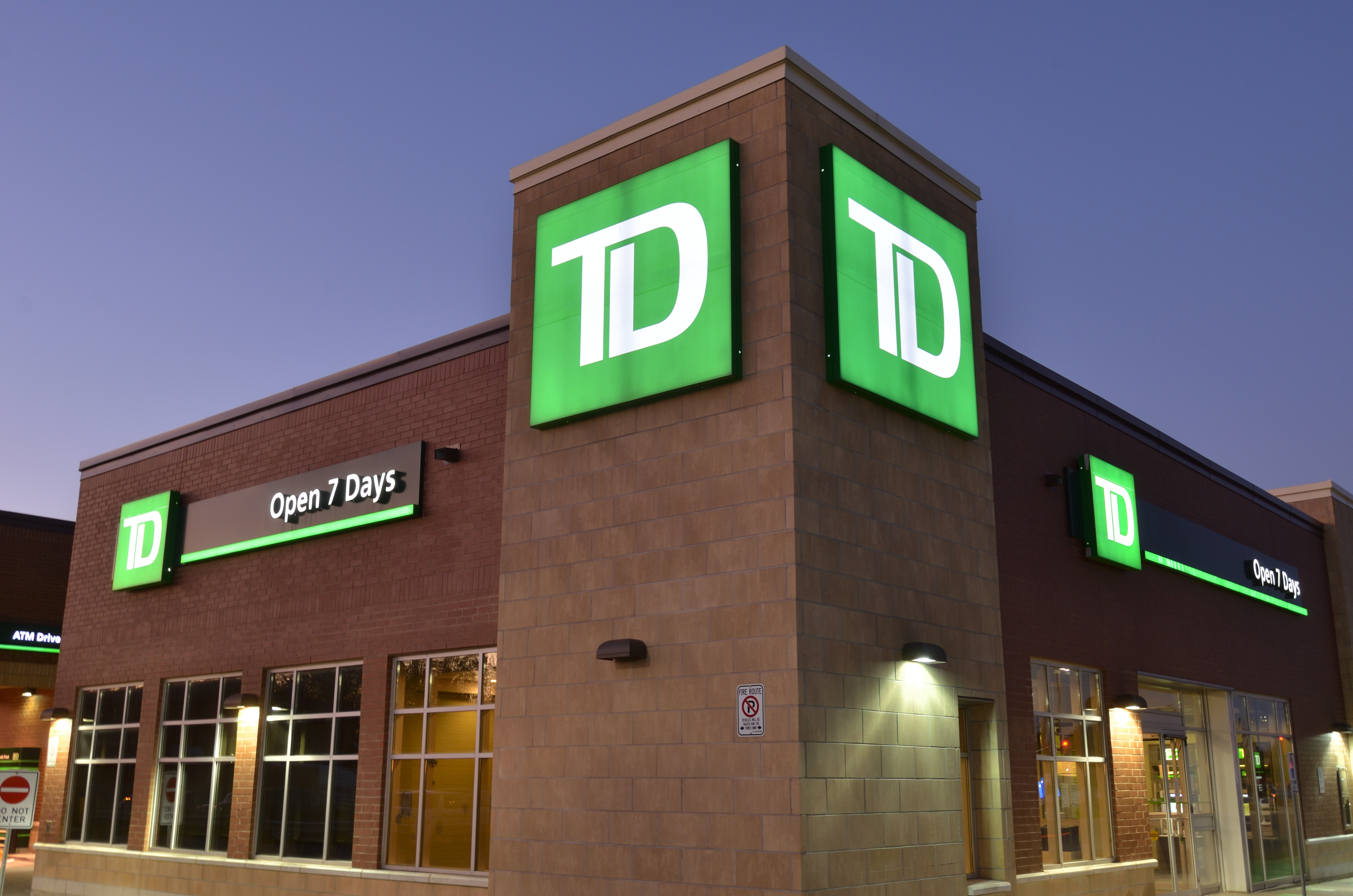
TD Canada Trust in Markham

In 2010, TD Canada Trust launched a mobile banking app for iOS, Android and BlackBerry platforms, allowing clients to perform many of the same transactions that are available through EasyWeb online banking.

In June 2012, TD Canada Trust introduced an enhanced Access Card with the new Visa Debit / Interac Flash access card which allows customers to use it via the phone or online and at international merchants through the Visa network.

=== Services ===
TD provides over 200 different languages on phone service for customers in Canada, including English, French, Mandarin and Cantonese. Five languages (English, French, Italian, Cantonese and Portuguese) are provided on ATMs.

== Controversy ==
Toronto-Dominion Bank has come under fire due to a series of articles published by CBC News that question its banking practices. The first article written to the Go Public portion of the CBC Business section was posted on 10 March 2017, under the title "'We do it because our jobs are at stake': TD bank employees admit to breaking the law for fear of being fired".

On 15 March 2017, another article was released by CBC News that reported thousands of banking employees from the top-five banks in Canada (RBC, BMO, CIBC, TD and Scotiabank) being pressured to meet unreasonable sales targets.

TD has been accused of pinkwashing for using its prominent sponsorship of Pride Toronto as a demographic marketing tool, while locking trans women out of their accounts if they attempt to access telephone banking in what the bank identifies as a "male voice" and mislabels as fraud. There have also been multiple complaints that depositors who purchased RRSPs from pre-merger TD Bank or Canada Trust have lost access to these funds as TD Canada Trust claims to have no record of the deposits, the pretext being that the institution is only required to retain records for seven years. There have also been cases where the bank has absolved itself of responsibility for theft or fraudulent access to depositors accounts by third parties, blaming the depositor for fraud which is no fault of their own.

== See also ==
- TD Canada Trust Tower, Calgary
