= A. Charles Baillie =

Canadian bank president (born 1939)

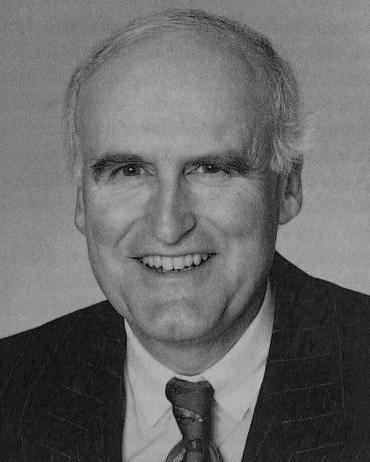
- Born: 20 December 1939 (age 86); Orillia, Ontario
- Education: Trinity College, Toronto (BA 1962); Harvard University (MBA 1964)
- Spouse: Marilyn Jane Michener (m. 1965)
- Children: 4

Alexander Charles Baillie Jr. OC (born 20 December 1939) is a Canadian banker that was the former CEO of TD Bank Financial Group; he served in this role until December, 2002. He was the 12th Chancellor and is Chancellor Emeritus of Queen's University.

== Early life and education ==
Alexander Charles Baillie was born on December 20, 1939, the son of Dr Alexander Charles Baillie Sr. (1908–1998) and Jean Gibson (1906–2002). He grew up in Orillia, Ontario, and was educated at the University of Toronto Schools.

He attended Trinity College at the University of Toronto, where he studied Honours Political Science and Economics. Baillie graduated with a B.A. in 1962, and then moved on to Harvard Business School where he earned his M.B.A. in 1964.

== Career ==
Baillie began working for the Toronto-Dominion Bank in 1964 and became president in 1995. The following year he pushed the bank into discount brokerage with its $715 million acquisition of Waterhouse Investor Services. In 1997, he succeeded Richard M. Thomson as CEO.

During his tenure as CEO, Baillie lead a failed attempt to merge with CIBC, but was later successful in acquiring Canada Trust. In his last year as CEO, the bank posted its first quarterly loss in fifteen years, largely attributed to lending activity in the telecommunications and cable television sectors that Baillie had pushed for in the late 1990's.

Baillie was succeeded by W. Edmund Clark as CEO in 2002 and stepped down from his role as chairman in 2004.

Baillie served as the 12th Chancellor of Queen's University. He was appointed on July 1, 2002 and completed two consecutive three-year terms as Chancellor. He was succeeded by David A. Dodge, the former Governor of the Bank of Canada, on July 1, 2008. On May 2, 2008, Baillie was named Chancellor Emeritus of Queen's University.

== Personal life and other interests ==
In 1965, he married Marilyn J. Michener; the couple had three sons and one daughter, all of whom graduated from Queen's. In 2006, Baillie established the Marilyn Baillie Picture Book Award to honour his wife, a children's book author and book and magazine editor.

Baillie is noted as an avid birdwatcher, outdoorsman, and history buff, who enjoys travelling and collecting antiquarian books. He has been an active member of the community, and holds several important positions. He was President of The Art Gallery of Ontario, Honorary Chair of the Canadian Council of Chief Executives, Honorary Campaign Chair of the Shaw Festival, Campaign Co-Chair for the Nature Conservancy of Canada, and was the Chair of the United Way of Greater Toronto Campaign 2000. In addition to his work with these educational and cultural organizations, Charles currently serves on the Board of Directors of Telus, Dana Holding Corporation, Ballard Power Systems, Canadian National Railway Company and George Weston Limited.

In 2006, he was made an Officer of the Order of Canada.
