= Brookfield Place (Toronto) =

Office complex in downtown Toronto, Ontario, Canada

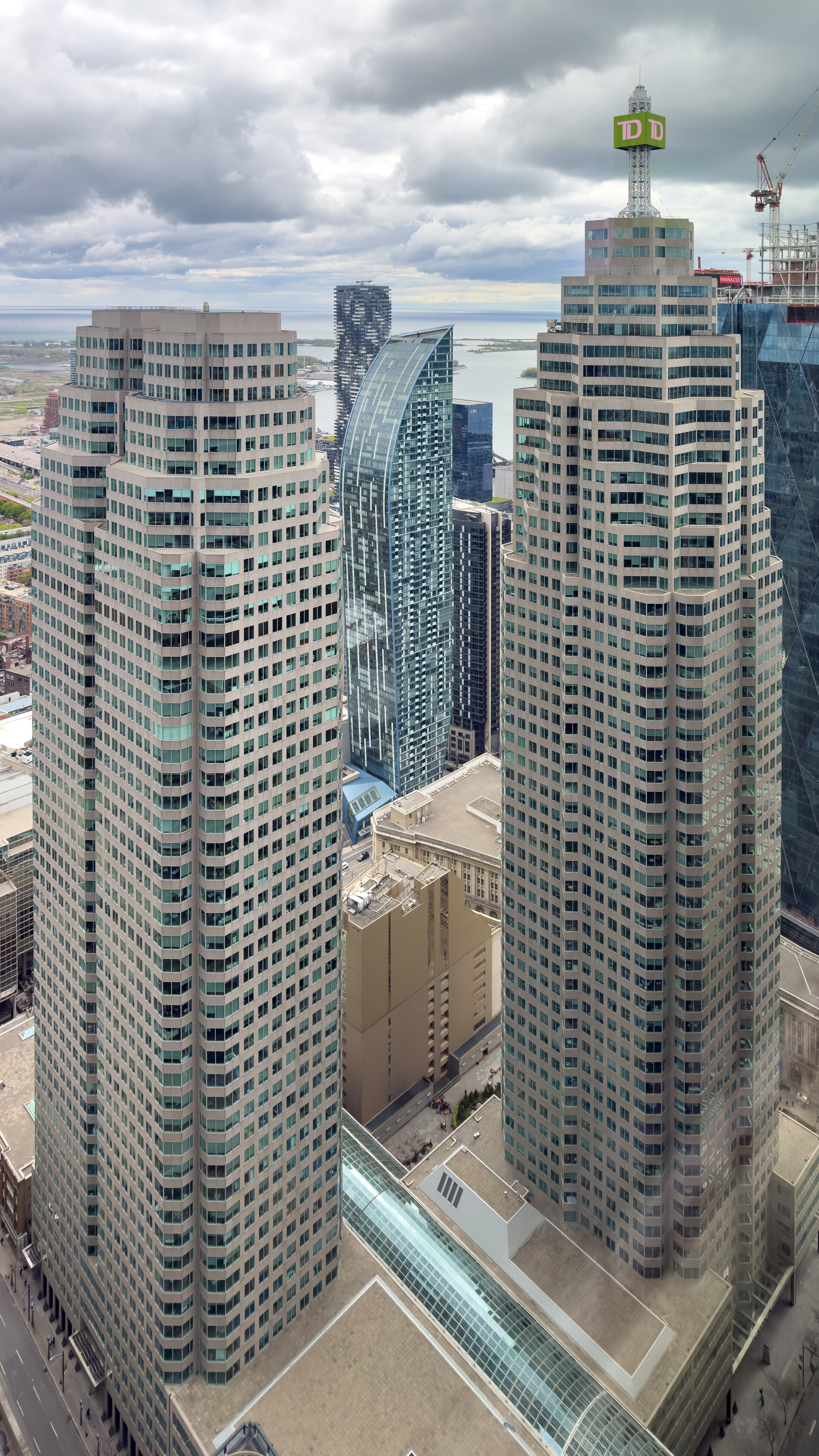

General information
- Type: Office building
- Architectural style: Postmodern
- Location: 161 and 181 Bay Street; Toronto, Ontario, Canada
- Coordinates: 43°38′49″N 79°22′43″W
- Construction started: 1985
- Completed: 1992
- Owner: 161 Bay: Oxford Properties and PSP Investments; 181 Bay: Brookfield Properties

Height
- Antenna spire: 161 Bay: 263 m (863 ft)
- Roof: 161 Bay: 227 m (745 ft); 181 Bay: 208 m (682 ft)

Technical details
- Floor count: 161 Bay: 53; 181 Bay: 49
- Floor area: 161 Bay: 127,470 m^{2} (1,372,100 sq ft); 181 Bay: 148,640 m^{2} (1,599,900 sq ft)

Design and construction
- Architects: Bregman + Hamann Architects; Skidmore, Owings & Merrill (interior galleria by Santiago Calatrava)

Website
- Official website

Brookfield Place (formerly BCE Place) is an office and retail complex in downtown Toronto, Ontario, Canada, comprising the 2.1 ha (5.2-acre) block bounded by Yonge Street, Wellington Street West, Bay Street, and Front Street West. The complex contains 242,000 m^{2} (2,604,866 sq ft) of office space, 59,000 sq ft (5,481 m^{2}) of retail space, and consists of two towers, the TD Canada Trust Tower (161 Bay Street) and the Bay Wellington Tower (181 Bay Street), linked by the Allen Lambert Galleria. Brookfield Place is also the home of the Hockey Hall of Fame (housed in an opulent former bank from 1885). The complex also includes 12 preserved heritage buildings. The complex is also connected to the PATH, which includes several shops and a food court in its basement.

== Allen Lambert Galleria ==
The Allen Lambert Galleria, sometimes described as the "crystal cathedral of commerce", is an atrium designed by Spanish architect Santiago Calatrava that connects Bay Street with Sam Pollock Square. Structural design was completed by Yolles Partnership Inc., while the general contractor was PCL Construction. The structural steel was fabricated by Canron Construction Corporation. The six-floor-high pedestrian thoroughfare is structured by eight freestanding supports on each side of the Galleria, which branch out into parabolic shapes evoking a forest canopy or a tree-lined avenue because of the presence of building facades along the sides of the structure.

The Galleria was the result of an international competition and was incorporated into the development in order to satisfy the City of Toronto's public art requirements. It is a frequently photographed space and is heavily featured as a backdrop for news reports, as well as TV and film productions.

The parabolic arched roof that Santiago Calatrava created for the assembly hall of the Wohlen High School in Wohlen, Aargau, Switzerland, is generally considered to be a precursor of the vaulted, parabolic ceiling in the Galleria.

== Ownership ==
Brookfield Place serves as the headquarters for Brookfield Properties, which owns the Bay Wellington Tower section of the complex. The TD Canada Trust Tower was owned in its entirety by the Ontario Municipal Employees Retirement System (OMERS) through its subsidiary Oxford Properties. In late 2012 or early 2013, OMERS and an unconfirmed entity identified in news reports as the Public Sector Pension Investment Board (PSP Investments) completed a swap transaction in which OMERS reduced its ownership stake in the tower to 50%. According to the Financial Post, "A spokesman for PSP would not confirm the deal had taken place, noting the pension fund never comments on any transaction." The swap valued the 50% stake in the tower at C$465 million, or C$750 per square foot, a record for commercial property in Canada.

== Hockey Hall of Fame ==
The opulent former Bank of Montreal branch at the northwest corner of Yonge and Front streets, built in 1885, also forms part of the complex and now serves as part of the Hockey Hall of Fame. It contains portraits of all Hall of Fame inductees and houses a number of hockey trophies, including the first Stanley Cup trophy.

== Redevelopment Plans ==
Brookfield, the owners of the complex, currently have plans to redevelop 22 Front St W, currently a 14 storey office building, into a 52 storey residential apartment tower. The proposal, known as 20 Front St W, will house 599 apartment units, and will stand 175m (574 ft) tall. It is designed by KPMB Architects.

22 Front St W originally had a proposal in 1990, during construction of the complex, known as “Brookfield Place Phase III”, however, this proposal was never built.

== Gallery ==
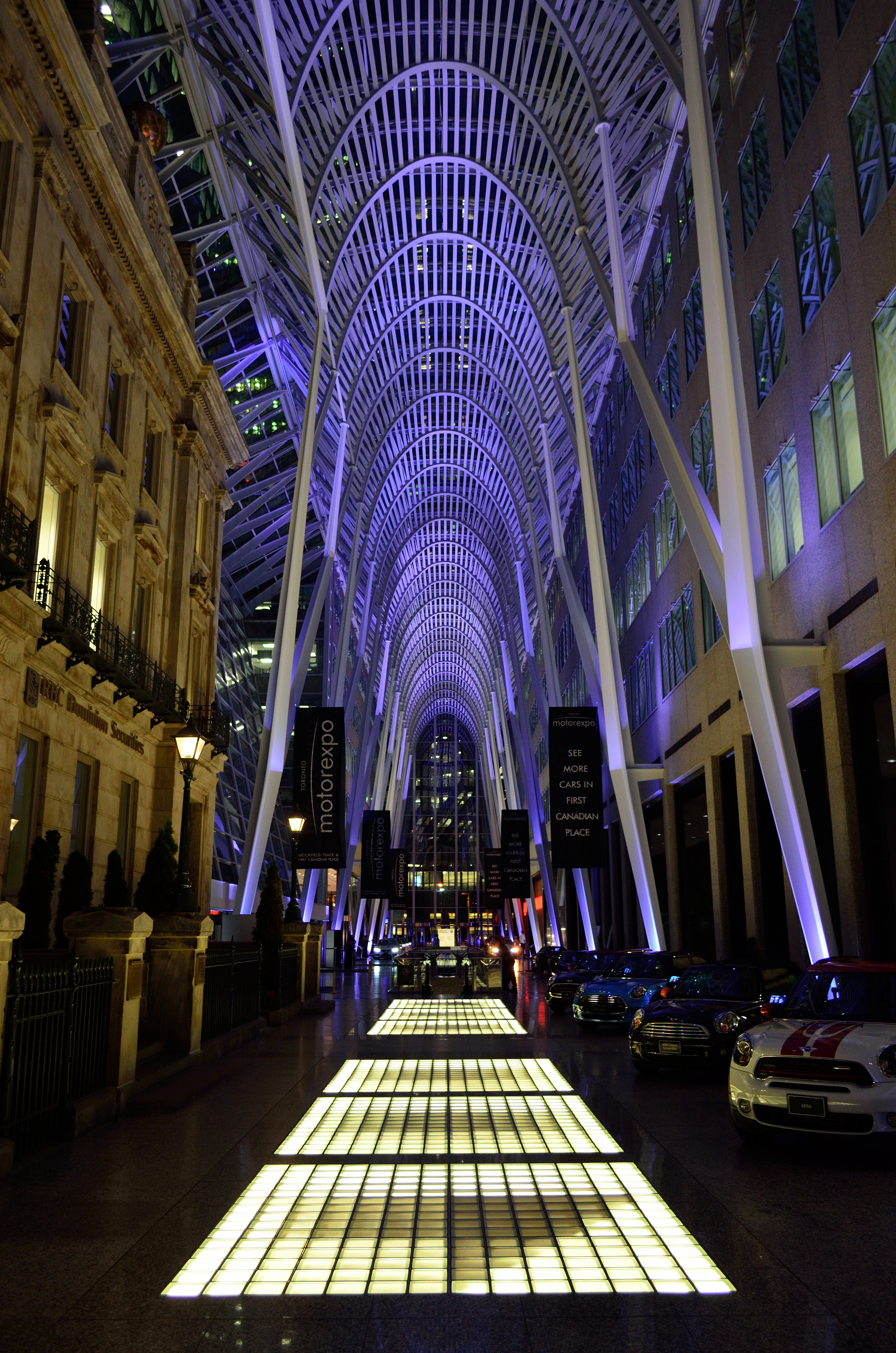
Allen Lambert Galleria, designed by Santiago Calatrava

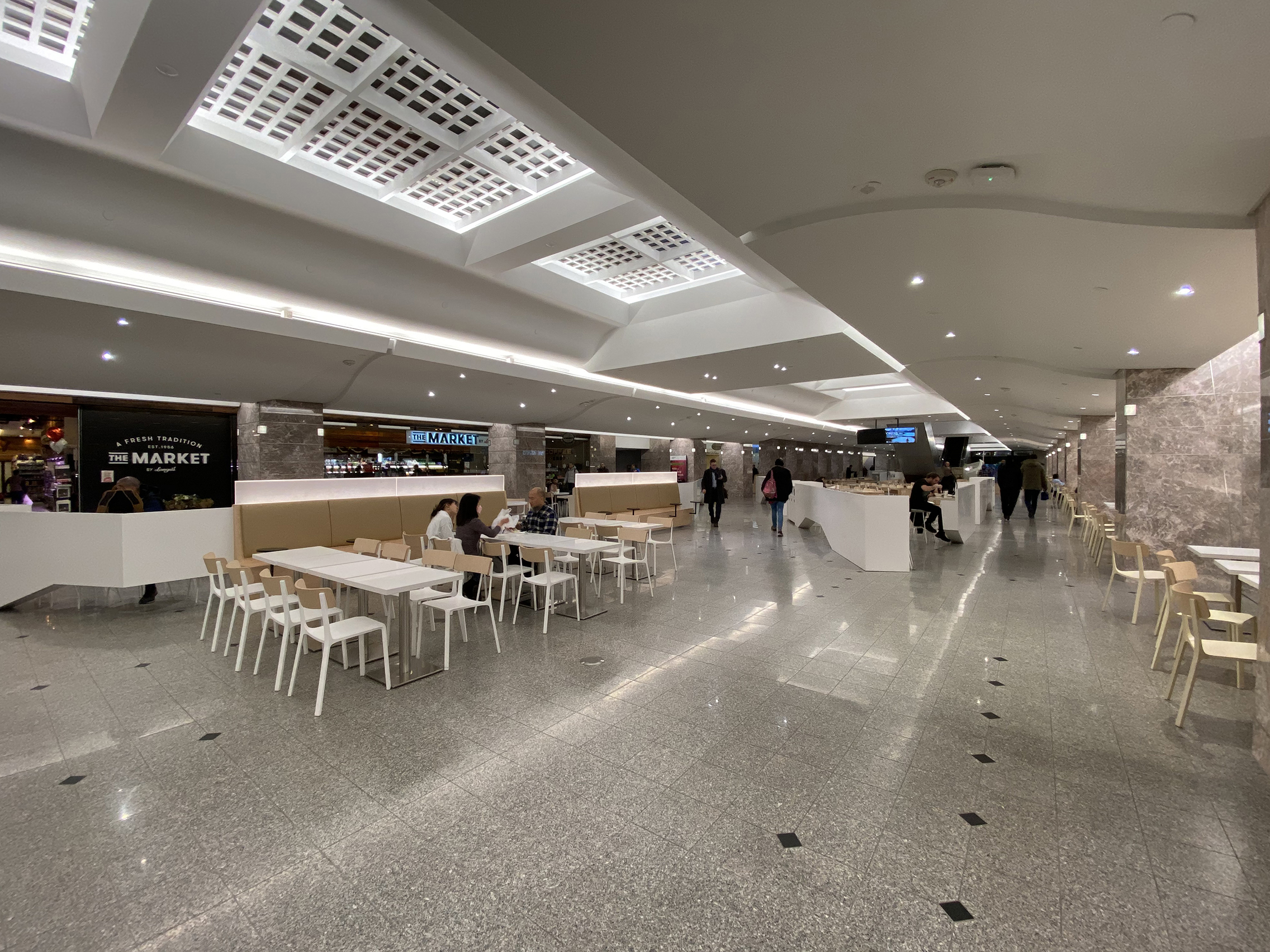
Food Court and shops in basement

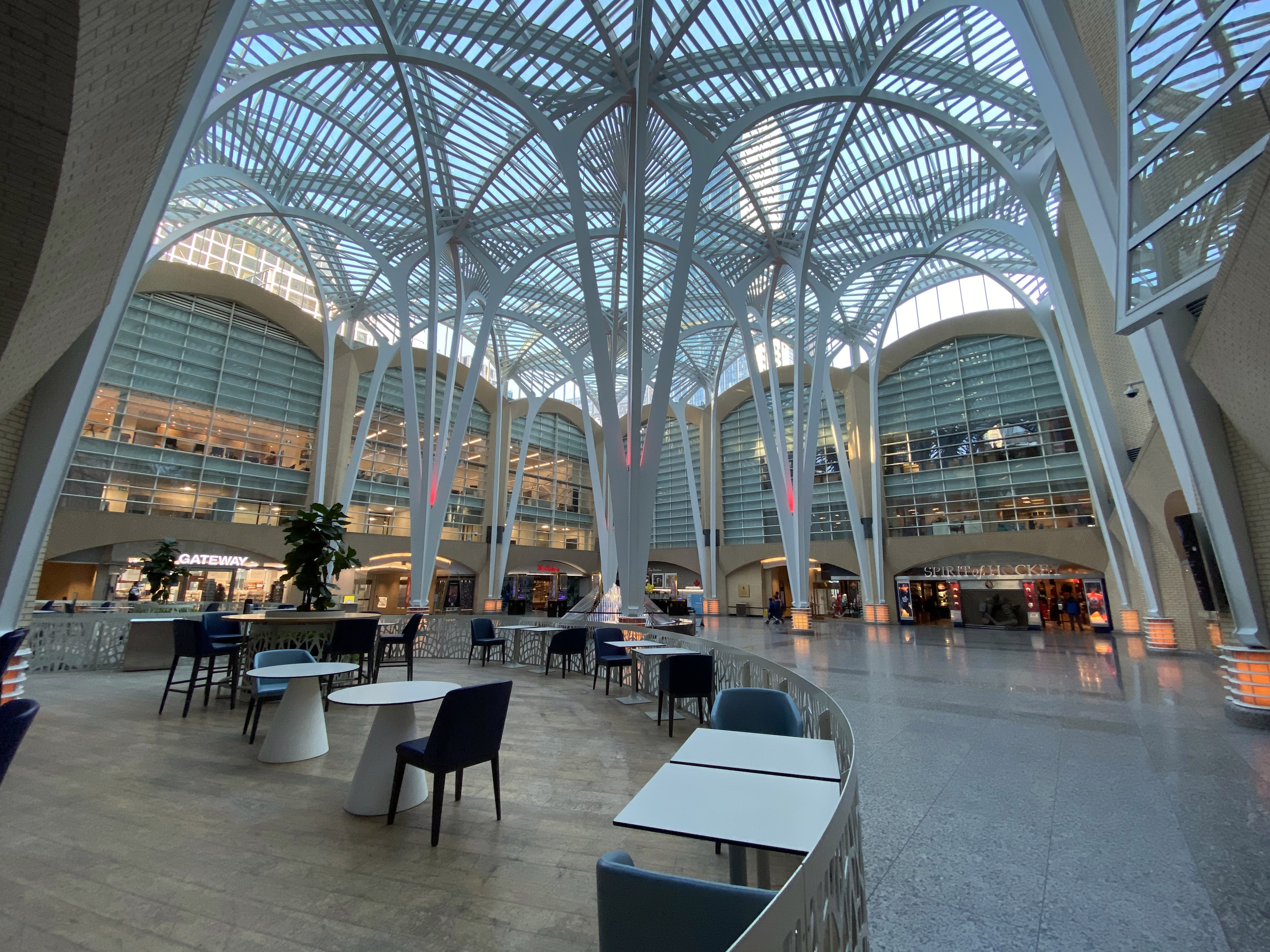
Intertwining steel arches at Sam Pollock Square

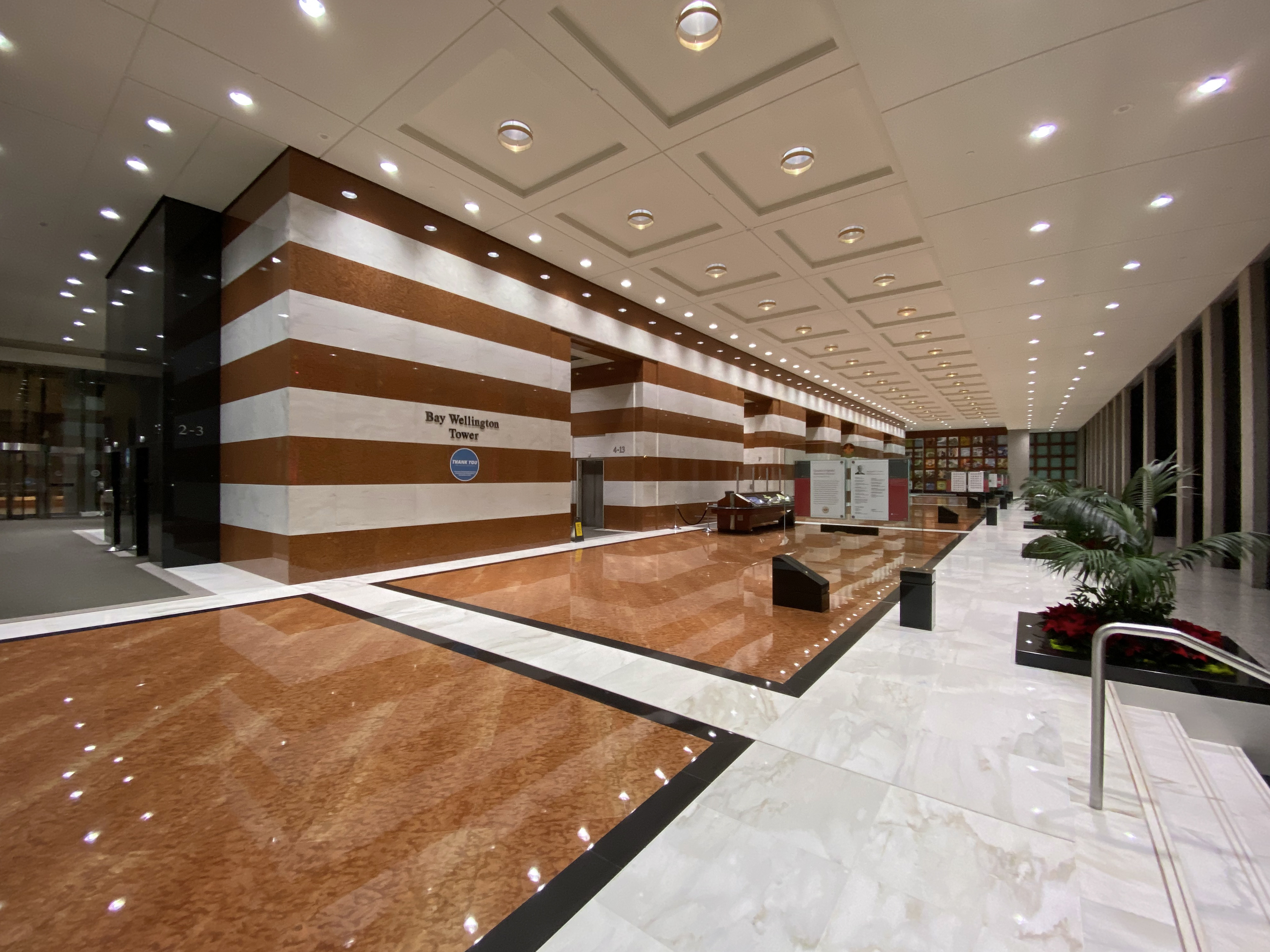
Bay Wellington Tower Office Lobby

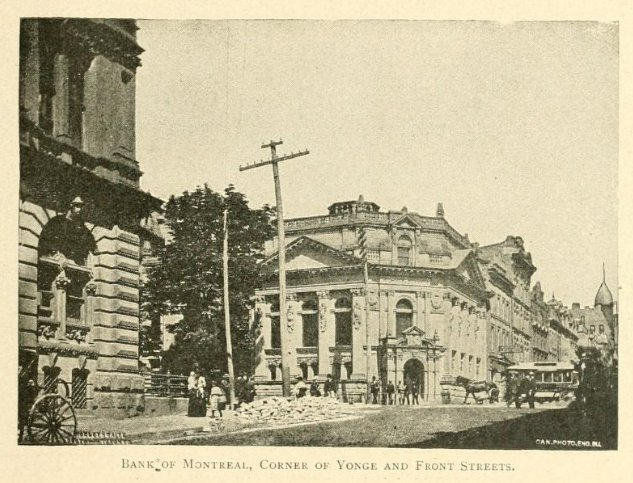
The building now used for the Hall, was a Bank of Montreal branch in the 1890s

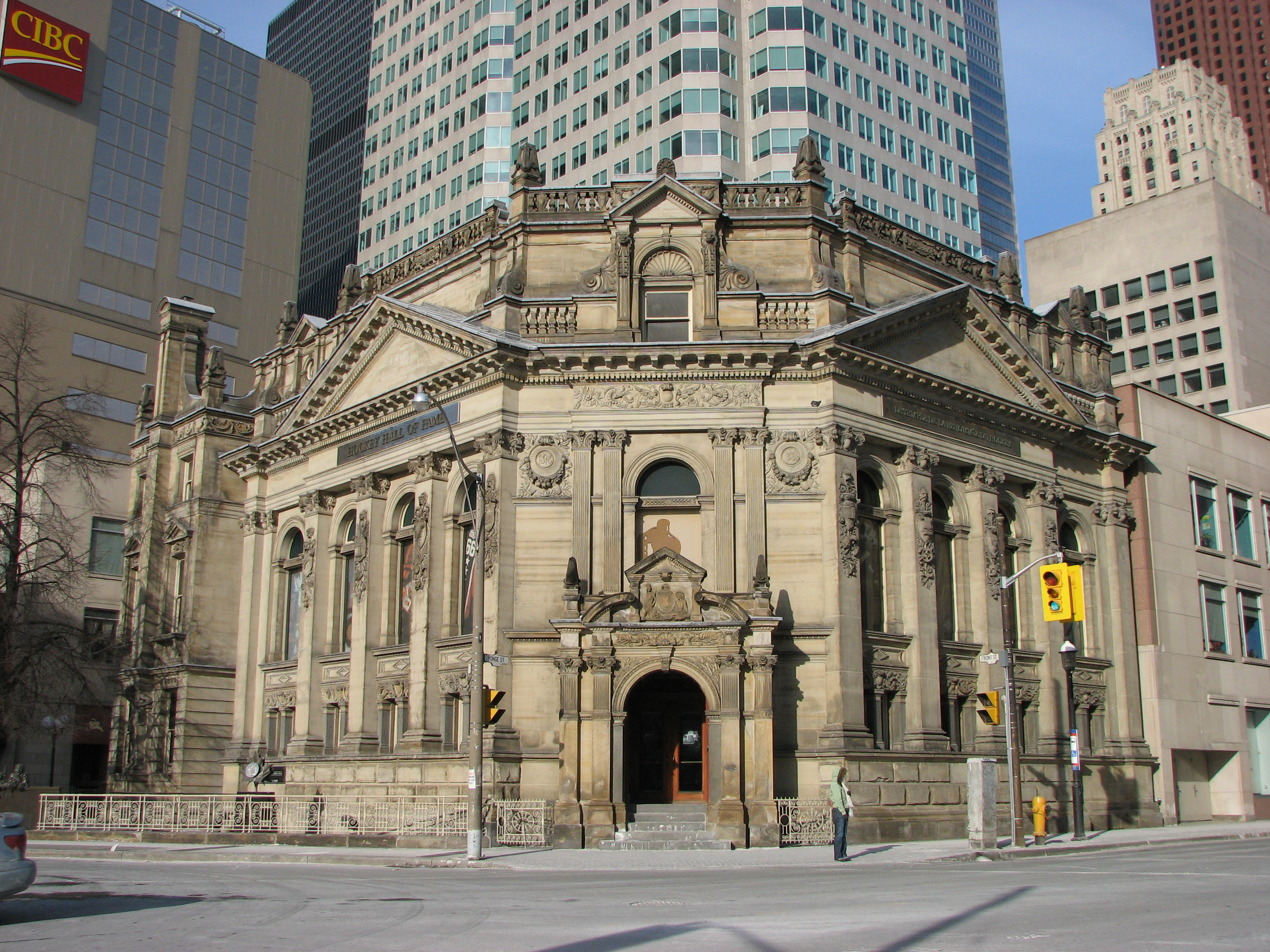
The Hockey Hall of Fame is at the corner of Front and Yonge Streets in downtown Toronto. The same building also houses the IIHF Hall of Fame.

== See also ==
- List of tallest buildings in Toronto
- List of tallest buildings in Canada
