= W. Edmund Clark =

Canadian businessman

- Born: 10 October 1947 (age 79); Toronto, Ontario, Canada
- Education: University of Toronto (BA); Harvard University (MA, PhD)
- Spouse: Frances Fletcher (m. 1969)

William Edmund Clark CM (born 10 October 1947) is a Canadian retired banker who served as president of Canada Trust from 1994 to 2000 and as president of the Toronto-Dominion Bank from 2000 to 2014. On April 3, 2013, Clark announced his intention to retire as president and CEO effective November 1, 2014 at age 67, after 12 years as CEO. After his retirement, Clark worked as an adviser for Ontario Premier Kathleen Wynne and helped introduce beer and wines into grocery stores and partially privatize the electricity distribution company Hydro One.

== Education ==
Clark graduated from the University of Toronto in 1969 with a Bachelor of Arts degree. He earned his master's degree and doctorate in economics from Harvard University in 1971 and 1974 respectively.

== Career ==
=== Before banking ===
From 1974 to 1984, Clark held a number of senior positions in the federal government. This included helping to develop the National Energy Program. In 1982, he won the Outstanding Civil Servant of the Year award. He was fired in 1985 upon change of government.

=== Banking career ===
In 1985, he joined Merrill Lynch, and three years later was appointed chairman and chief executive officer of Morgan Financial Corporation. He joined Canada Trust Financial Services Inc. in 1991, rising to president and chief executive officer in 1994, a position he held until 2000. Canada Trust was a customer focused financial institution which gained market share. As CEO of Canada Trust he introduced same sex benefits in 1994, a first among companies and governments in North America.

Following TD's acquisition of Canada Trust Financial Services in February 2000, Clark joined TD Bank Group as chairman and chief executive officer of TD Canada Trust. In this role, he oversaw the successful integration of the TD and Canada Trust banking operations. Clark then became president and chief operating officer of TD Bank Group in July 2000, and became president and chief executive officer of TD Bank Group on December 20, 2002 upon the retirement of A. Charles Baillie as chairman and chief executive officer while John W. Thompson was appointed as non-executive chairman. Clark is credited with turning the TD bank into a North American powerhouse in retail banking while avoiding the problems which hurt other banks in the 2008 financial crisis.

On April 3, 2013, Clark announced his intention to retire as president and CEO effective November 1, 2014 at age 67, after 12 years as CEO. On November 1, 2014, Clark was succeeded in these roles by chief operating officer Bharat Masrani.

=== After TD ===
Under the Wynne government in 2015, Clark worked as an adviser and helped partially privatize Hydro One, the electrical distribution company.

Clark reformed the Alcohol and Gaming Commission of Ontario and the Liquor Licence Act to allow six-packs of beer to be sold in Ontario grocery stores. The reforms also ensured better access for craft brewers to the beer store and opened up grocery stores to sell wine in a manner which helped small Ontario wineries and craft brewers.

Clark authored a report on e-health which outlined an approach to improving Ontario’s health care system, lowering costs and improving outcomes.

Until the deal closed on June 30, 2017, Clark was also instrumental in helping US Steel's subsidiary Stelco emerge from bankruptcy under new owners Bedrock Industries and save 2500 jobs and reinforce pensions for more than 10,000 pensioners.

Clark was Chairman of the LCBO and helped oversee the Ontario Cannabis Store, the crown corporation set up to sell cannabis legally. He agreed to stay on to support the new government led by Doug Ford during the transition. He resigned effective August 30, 2018.

In 2015, Clark was named a director of Thomson Reuters and an advisor to Woodbridge. He departed the position in 2025. He is also Deputy Chair of Spinmaster, a Canadian based toy company which is one of the largest toy companies in the world. He is also a partner in Radical Ventures, a venture capital firm focused on A.I. start ups and one of the most successful venture capital firms in the world. In addition Clark is Chair of the Vector Institute an independent non profit institutions dedicated to Artificial Intelligence. He is also Chair of Friends of Ruby, an organization focused on helping 2SLGBTQA youth.

== Appointments and community involvement ==
Clark is a significant philanthropist and supports a number of social agencies. He has been a major donor to the United Way and was the 2010 Cabinet Chair for United Way Toronto. Clark was a member of the Chair's Advisory Council for Habitat for Humanity Toronto and has been a lead supporter. He is a strong supporter of Fife House Foundation, a provider of supportive housing and support services. Clark also provides support to WoodGreen Community Services, an organization that delivers programs to build sustainable communities in the Toronto area and has been a lead donor to Homeward Bound, a program to help single mothers get a post secondary education and permanent jobs. Clark has been a strong advocate on behalf of the LGBT community and a lead donor for Friends of Ruby, an organization supporting LGBT youth on the street with counseling and transition housing. He has been chair of the advisory board for the School of Public Policy and Governance at the University of Toronto and a major donor to the university. Clark has also been a donor to a number of hospitals.

In 2014, Clark was elected to the board of trustees of US public policy organization the Brookings Institution.

== Recognition ==
Clark has received honorary degrees from Mount Allison University, Queen's University, the University of Western Ontario, University of Toronto, York University, and Ryerson University.

In 2010 Clark was appointed to the Order of Canada for his "contributions to Canada's banking and financial industry, and for his voluntary and philanthropic endeavours". Clark also received Egale's Leadership Award in honour of his leadership in supporting LGBT communities, and the inaugural Catalyst Canada Honour, awarded to individuals who have made a critical and visible difference to women's advancement. Clark was also named Canada's Outstanding CEO of the Year in 2010 and again for CEO of the year in 2013 by a different selection group.

In 2011, Clark was named Ivey Business Leader of the Year by the Richard Ivey School of Business at the University of Western Ontario. That same year, he was acknowledged by GTA Association of Fundraising Professionals (AFP) with the "2011 Outstanding Philanthropist" award. In 2012 and 2013, Clark was selected by Barron's magazine as one of the world's 30 best CEOs. Then in October 2014, the Harvard Business Review named Clark on its list of the 100 Top Performing CEOs in the World, ranking him #47. In 2016 Clark was inducted into the Canadian Business Hall of Fame. In 2017 he received the Canadian Dealmakers Award.

== Family ==
Clark and his wife Fran live in Toronto; they have four grown children and twelve grandchildren.

== Speeches ==
Clark has been asked to speak at a number of prominent international events on a wide range of topics, including the Canadian economy, the banking industry, leadership values, and the importance of creating a diverse and inclusive culture in the workplace. The following is a selection of his remarks:

- "The Shift in Leadership" - Remarks at Canada's Outstanding CEO Award Dinner, Toronto, ON. February 17, 2011
- "Preserving The Things That Matter In A World Of Constrained Resources" - Remarks at the Ivey Business Leader Award Dinner, Toronto, ON. October 19, 2011
- "Building a Better Banking System for America" - Remarks delivered at the Chief Executives' Club of Boston, Boston College, Boston. April 26, 2012
- "Somewhere over the rainbow: a CEO's perspective on building an inclusive company" - Remarks delivered at the Economic Club of Canada coinciding with the WorldPride Human Rights Conference, Toronto, ON. June 25, 2014.
- "Final Major Address as TD's CEO" - Remarks delivered at the Empire Club of Canada, Toronto, September 16, 2014
- “AI is Working” at the Canadian Club in Toronto, ON. December 13, 2018

Business positions
Preceded by A. Charles Baillie	Toronto-Dominion Bank CEO; 2002-present Compensation for 2009: $15,188,391	Succeeded by Bharat Masrani
