= Richard M. Thomson =

Canadian banker (1933–2026)

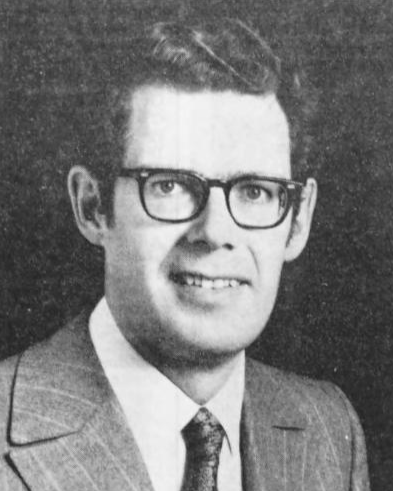
- Born: 14 August 1933; Winnipeg, Manitoba, Canada
- Died: 30 April 2026 (aged 92)
- Education: University of Toronto (BASc 1955); Harvard University (MBA 1957)
- Spouse: Heather Lorimer (m. 1959)

Richard Murray Thomson OC (14 August 1933 – 30 April 2026) was a Canadian banker who served from 1972 to 1978 as president and from 1978 to 1998 as chairman of the Toronto-Dominion Bank. Thomson joined the bank in 1957 and served subsequently in several branches. In 1963 he became assistant to the president at the head office in Toronto, and through the 1960s became the bank's Assistant General Manager, Deputy Chief General Manager, and Chief General Manager. In 1971 he was named a vice-president and elected to the board of directors. In September 1972, age 39, he was appointed president of the bank, making him one of the youngest senior executives in Canadian banking history. Thomson remained president until April 1978, when he succeeded Allen Thomas Lambert to become chairman and chief executive officer. Thomson retired as chairman in January 1998.

== Biography ==
He earned a Bachelor of Arts and Science degree in engineering from the University of Toronto and a Master of Business Administration from Harvard Business School.

He joined the Toronto-Dominion Bank in 1957 and served in a variety of management positions until succeeding Allen Lambert as president in 1972. He was appointed chairman and CEO in 1978. He retired as CEO in 1997 and as chairman in 1998.

Thomson has served on the board of directors of the Canada Pension Plan Investment Board, Thomson-Reuters Corporation, Nexen Inc. and S. C. Johnson & Son Canadian Occidental Petroleum, Inco Ltd., Prudential Insurance Company of America, the Toronto Dominion Bank, and the Hospital for Sick Children Foundation.

Art Gallery of Ontario: He served as trustee of the Art Gallery of Ontario from 1968 to 1974 and director of the foundation from 1986 to 1992.

Hospital for Sick Children, Toronto: He held various positions for over thirty four years as trustee of the hospital and director and chairman of the foundation.

On 21 October 1998, Thomson was made an Officer of the Order of Canada.

Thomson died at his home in Toronto on 30 April 2026, at the age of 92.
