= Allen Lambert =

Canadian banker (1911–2002)

- Born: 28 December 1911; Regina, Saskatchewan
- Died: 25 October 2002 (aged 90); Toronto, Ontario
- Education: Victoria High School
- Spouse: Marion Grace Kotchapaw (m. 1950)
- Military career
- Allegiance: Canada
- Branch: Royal Canadian Navy
- Service years: 1943–1945
- Rank: Lieutenant
- Conflicts: World War II

Allen Thomas Lambert OC (28 December 1911 – 25 October 2002) was a Canadian banker who served from 1960 to 1972 as president and from 1961 to 1978 as chairman of the Toronto-Dominion Bank.

== Junior to General Manager ==
Fresh from high school at the age of fifteen, Allen Lambert joined a Victoria, British Columbia branch of the Bank of Toronto in 1927 as an $8-per-week junior clerk. He was recognized as a promising banker early in his career. His first manager reported that the young Lambert was "doing very well and seems to have a good grasp of his work. This boy has a good future." Promoted to Accountant in a Vancouver branch, he moved on to Brockville and then to the foreign exchange department at the Montreal main branch. He later observed that "We always tried to read something into every move and it was generally thought that if you were selected to go to Montreal someone had noticed you." After service as a naval officer in the North Atlantic during World War II, Lambert became manager of the Yellowknife branch during the gold boom of the late 1940s, and then began a rapid rise through the ranks. He became Assistant General Manager in 1953 and was involved in the negotiations for the merger of the Bank of Toronto and the Dominion Bank in 1955. As General Manager of the new Toronto-Dominion Bank he managed the uniting of two corporate cultures and building a style and image for a renewed and ambitious organization.

== Chief Executive Officer ==
Lambert became president of The Toronto-Dominion Bank (TD) in 1960 and chairman the following year. The bank was not in the first rank of financial institutions at that time, and he later recalled "we had all gone through a period of frustration at being smaller than the others, and not being quite able to compete fully." Over the eighteen years of Lambert's leadership, TD became Canada's fastest growing bank and a major presence on the international financial scene. Lambert looked for business opportunities world-wide, opening local offices, and building solid relationships with major clients. He promoted customer service, ensured the bank was an innovator in technology, and instituted progressive training and benefit programs for employees. He started TD's corporate art program and, as a centennial project in 1967, developed one of Canada's foremost collections of Inuit art. He was also involved in public and community service, chairing royal commissions and federal advisory bodies, serving as a member of international organizations, and acting as a frequent speaker and essayist on economic issues. Shortly before his retirement in 1976, he was appointed an Officer of the Order of Canada in recognition of his contributions to national life.

== The TD Centre ==
Lambert's was involved in the construction of the Toronto Dominion Centre. He viewed it as a tangible statement of the bank's position in the forefront of industry. After rejecting a number of design proposals, Lambert turned to the German/American architect Mies van der Rohe to develop a plan for a complex of buildings that would revolutionize the Toronto landscape. Now considered a Mies masterwork, the Centre is a lasting testament to Lambert's vision and imagination. William Thorsell, CEO of the Royal Ontario Museum, wrote in a tribute to Allen Lambert: "For those who build, it is not a question of whether a legacy remains, but what its quality is. In Athens, in the Yucatan, in Paris, architecture still speaks eloquently centuries after so much else of value is gone. In 1967, a banker insisted that Toronto be remembered with respect."

== Honours ==
In 1976, he was made an Officer of the Order of Canada, and was named to the Canadian Business Hall of Fame in the Class of 1985.

The Business Hall of Fame Companions is featured in a display in the "Allen Lambert Galleria" located at Brookfield Place in Toronto.

Additionally, he received numerous honorary degrees from several of the major Canadian institutions.
