= TD Bank (United States) =

Bank in the United States

TD Bank, N.A.
- Trade name: TD Bank
- Type: Subsidiary
- Industry: Banking; Financial services
- Founded: January 1852; 174 years ago, in Portland, Maine, U.S.
- Headquarters: Mount Laurel, New Jersey, United States
- Number of locations: 1,158
- Area served: Connecticut, Delaware, Florida, Maine, Maryland, Massachusetts, New Hampshire, New Jersey, New York, North Carolina, Pennsylvania, Rhode Island, South Carolina, Vermont, Virginia, and Washington, D.C.
- Key people: Leo Salom (CEO)
- Total assets: US$366 billion (2025)
- Number of employees: 26,714 (2022)
- Parent: Toronto-Dominion Bank
- Website: www.td.com

TD Bank, N.A. (previously TD Banknorth) is an American national bank and the United States subsidiary of the Canadian multinational TD Bank Group. It operates primarily across the East Coast, in 15 U.S. states and Washington, D.C. TD Bank is the fifteenth-largest U.S. bank by deposits and the 15th largest bank in the United States by total assets, resulting from a series of several mergers and acquisitions. TD Bank, N.A. is headquartered in Mount Laurel, New Jersey, an inner suburb eight miles (13 km) outside Philadelphia. TD Bank is a federally chartered bank, thus its trading name bears "N.A." letters.

In August 2004, Toronto-Dominion Bank became the majority owner, rebranding the Banknorth Group, Inc. to TD Banknorth, N.A. All remaining shares of TD Banknorth were acquired by Toronto-Dominion Bank on April 20, 2007. On April 10, 2008, TD Banknorth acquired New Jersey–based Commerce Bank and rebranded to simply TD Bank, with joint headquarters in Cherry Hill, New Jersey and Portland, Maine. The legal name of the bank was changed to TD Bank, N.A. on May 31, 2008, with all TD Banknorth branches outside of New England and all Commerce Bank branches being rebranded in the fall of 2008. The remaining branches, in New England, took on the new name in September 2009.

On October 10, 2024, in a historic settlement with U.S. authorities, TD pleaded guilty and agreed to pay $3 billion in combined penalties for money laundering conspiracy over a decade, including failure to monitor trillions in potentially suspicious transactions annually, necessitating a four-year independent monitorship and comprehensive AML reforms. This marks the first time a major bank in U.S. history pleaded guilty to conspiracy to commit money laundering, and the largest penalty ever imposed under the Bank Secrecy Act.

== History ==
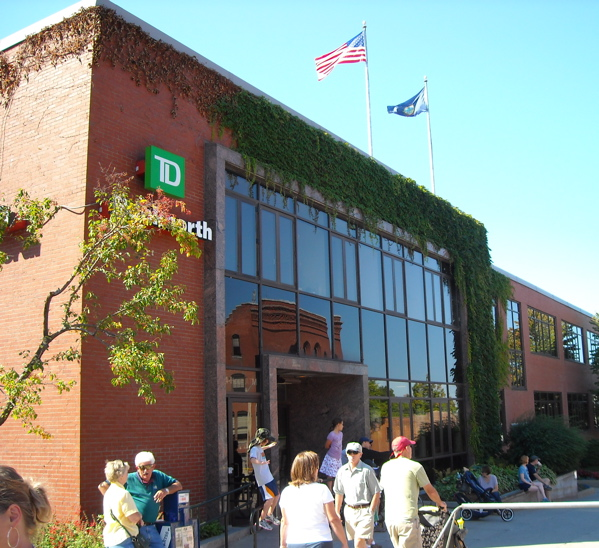
TD Banknorth in Burlington, Vermont

The origins of Banknorth Group, now TD Bank, lie in a number of local Maine savings banks, and in Vermont dating back to 1802 with Woodstock National Bank.

=== Portland Savings Bank ===
The Portland Savings Bank was established in 1852, and was initially open only on Wednesdays and Saturdays from 11:00 a.m. to 1:00 p.m. Albion K. Parris, Portland's mayor, was the first President. Support of community and public projects was an important objective of the bank. It weathered the great fire of Portland and the financial panics in 1873 and 1878, and at its 50th year in 1902 had 24,000 depositors, deposits of almost $10,000,000, and a staff of nine. In 1906, a branch on Congress Street joined the Head Office branch, and nineteen years later all business moved to Congress Street.

The Stock Market Crash of 1929 and the ensuing Great Depression gravely threatened the bank. To handle the number of properties it came to own through foreclosure, the bank established a "Real Estate Department" or property management division. Returning to prosperity with the post-war mortgage boom, Portland Savings was revolutionized under the leadership of Roger Lambert, CEO from 1965 to 1981. He encouraged the creation of a more dynamic board of directors and established a wide array of bank services, following the model of the commercial banks. He expanded Portland Savings' portfolio of commercial loans and introduced innovative retail products such as money market certificates. Between 1965 and 1981 the bank grew from 2 to 13 branches across Maine, with assets increasing from $63 to $294 million.

=== People's Savings Bank ===
People's Savings was founded in 1875 in Lewiston, Maine. A conservative but successful bank, it prospered with the local mill economy. Early in the twentieth century the bank innovated by opening $1 accounts for all babies born in the area, on condition that there were no withdrawals for ten years. The policy lasted into the 1970s. Christmas and vacation clubs were also established. Local banks suffered greatly from the decline of the mill economy in the 1920s and 1930s, but enjoyed a recovery during World War II, with industrial renewal and a defense bond business. In the post-war period People's helped finance the new industries that were gradually replacing textiles in the local economy.

=== Rockland Savings/Heritage Savings Bank ===
Rockland Savings was established in 1868 in Rockland, Maine, (following attempts in 1855 and 1861). In 1974, it changed its name to the Heritage Savings Bank. In 1978, it merged with:

- Penobscot Savings, Bangor, founded in 1869 and a pioneer in savings for children in association with the local school system. A "small conservative bank in a small conservative city," it did not expand its branch system until 1961, when a second office was opened.
- Waterville Savings, founded in Waterville in 1869.

=== Franklin County Savings Bank & Trust Co. ===
Franklin County Savings Bank was founded in 1899 in St. Albans, Vermont. The bank maintained the name Franklin County Bank until the merger with Lamoille County Bank & Trust Company (1875) in the early 1970s. After the merger, the bank adopted a new name, Franklin Lamoille Bank. The bank also incorporated a holding company named Banknorth.

Woodstock National Bank was founded in 1802 and merged into the Howard Bancorp. The Woodstock National Bank maintained its name until June 1999 when it merged into its sister bank First Vermont Bank & Trust Company.

=== Granite Savings Bank & Trust Company ===
The Granite Saving Bank & Trust Company was founded in Barre, Vermont in 1885. The bank's original office, located on North Main Street in Barre, is now the home for a senior citizen group. The current headquarters is 36 North Main Street, Barre. Banknorth Group Inc. planned to maintain the name until it was purchased by Peoples Bank (Maine). In 2000, Granite Savings Bank & Trust merged with its sister bank The Howard Bank, a change some customers never noticed until their statement arrived.

=== Howard Bank N.A. ===
The Howard National Bank & Trust Company of Burlington, Vermont, was founded in 1870. The Bank bought out a few banks and took them under the Howard Bank name. The Bank changed and shortened its name when it became a more statewide banking company. The Bank also created a banking holding company as "Howard Bancorp" in 1995, and in 1996, the Howard Bancorp merged with Banknorth Group Inc. In the deal, Howard Bancorp decided to take on the Banknorth Group name.

=== First Vermont Bank & Trust Company ===
The First Vermont Bank & Trust was founded in 1906. The Company bought Franklin Lamoille Bank and was one of the first banks to offer on-line banking for the tellers. However, when Howard Bancorp purchased Banknorth Group, management found it too expensive to upgrade the systems of the new division. In 1999, the bank acquired Woodstock National Bank and in 2002, all three Vermont banks were merged into Banknorth N.A. Vermont, a division of Banknorth N.A.

The oldest component that Banknorth currently has recorded for the Vermont banking company is Woodstock National Bank. All the Vermont banking companies date to the 1800s with the exception of First Vermont Bank from 1906.

=== Portland/Peoples/Heritage merger ===
"The late 1970s and early 1980s were difficult years for the thrift industry. As inflation and interest rates soared into double digits, savings banks in Maine and elsewhere found themselves forced to pay higher interest rates to attract depositors while maintaining a large portfolio of long-term low-interest mortgages." In 1981, Portland Savings declared a loss and recognized a pressing need for consolidation in the local banking market. The following year Portland and People's arranged a merger, and the new bank adopted the People's name. In 1984, People's and Heritage merged as Peoples Heritage, a billion dollar institution with Wes Bonney as the first President.

The new bank, with a total of 35 branches, moved quickly to expand its ATM network, introduce innovations such as Cashline phone banking, and develop an emphasis on commercial loan, a new development for a traditional savings bank. In 1986, in an effort to acquire capital for expansion, People's dropped its charter as a mutual bank and rechartered into a public corporation.

With its new resources the bank planned to grow its asset base from $1 billion to $4 billion within five years. This would be accomplished through acquisitions, an expanded branch network, and a rapid increase in commercial lending and real estate. In 1988, Peoples Heritage reorganized itself as a bank holding company in order to gain greater flexibility in making bank and non-bank acquisitions.

Acquisitions in the period were:

- Northeast Leasing: 1987
- Six branches from Casco Northern Bank: 1989
- First Coastal Bank, Portsmouth, New Hampshire: 1989
- Merchants National Bank of Dover
- First National Bank of Portsmouth, founded 1824
- Oxford Bank & Trust Company from Bank of Vermont (As part of Bank of Boston's purchase of Bank of Vermont, regulators required it to sell the Oxford Bank & Trust component.) (5 branches - 1988).
- Had a $100 million personal trusts department, the first venture of People's into this area.

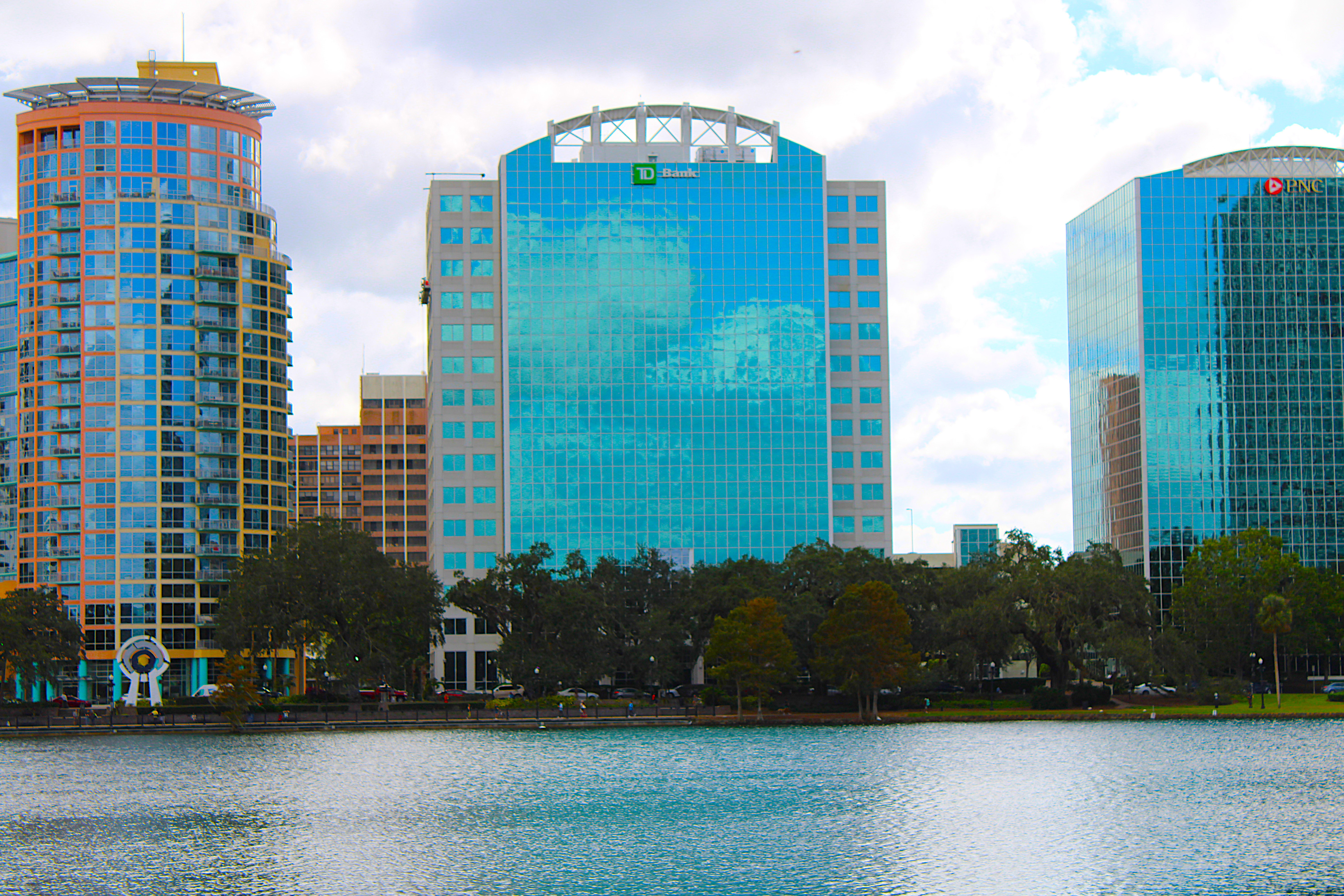
TD Bank in Orlando, Florida

=== 1990 recession and crisis ===
In 1989, the Maine real estate market collapsed. In this period of crisis, William J. Ryan became the new president and CEO. In 1990, the recession resulted in 111 bank closures or mergers in New England. Peoples Heritage stock began to fall as serious problems emerged with bad loans, particularly in the faltering real estate sector, but also in the commercial realm. In the period 1990 to 1992, Peoples Heritage was losing money, and federal regulators issued a cease and desist order restricting the bank's freedom in the loans area. In response, the management team was shaken up, and special teams were assigned to loans review and restructuring. The bank opened an innovative storefront retail real estate office to move foreclosed properties.

Recovery began by mid-1992. The bank had aggressively reduced its portfolio of non-performing loans, and all discernible asset quality trends were positive, resulting in a favorable impact to the bottom line. In 1993, the bank again became profitable, and it re-capitalized with a rights offering in Q4 1992, generating $38 million in new capital.

In 1993, Peoples Heritage management held a retreat to plan strategy for future growth. Bill Ryan proposed a doubling of assets to $5 billion through a maximization of market share in Maine and acquisition of other community banks in the region.

The plan resulted in the following acquisitions during the 1990s:

- Mid-Maine Savings, Auburn, Maine, 1993
- Bankcore, Inc / North Conway Bank, North Conway, New Hampshire, 1995
- Bank of New Hampshire, 1995, second largest bank in New Hampshire, founded in 1875, with assets of 1.7 billion. The acquisition increased the size of People's by 1/3 to $4.2 billion. As well, it established Peoples Heritage Bank's credentials as a commercial bank. Terms of the merger allowed The Bank of New Hampshire to keep its name and management structure.
- Family Bancorp, Haverhill, Massachusetts, 1996
- Atlantic Bancorp, Portland, Maine, 15 branch operation with assets of $470, 1997
- CFX, Keene, New Hampshire, 1997, originally Cheshire County Savings Bank, 1897. The acquisition doubled People's assets to $10 billion. NH branches became part of The Bank of New Hampshire, while Massachusetts branches joined Family Bancorp.
- Springfield Institution for Savings (SIS) 1998, Springfield, Massachusetts - 1.8 billion in assets, included Glastonbury Bank and Trust Company of Glastonbury, Connecticut
- Banknorth Group of Burlington, Vermont (1870), agreement reached in 1999

=== Acquisition of Peoples by Banknorth ===
Former Banknorth logo

The Banknorth acquisition was the most significant to date, and with it People's assumed the Banknorth name. Banknorth Group Inc. was headquartered in Burlington, Vermont. The company was the holding company for: Franklin Lamoille Bank (1899) in St. Albans, The Howard Bank N.A. (1870) in Burlington; Stratevest N.A. (Investment & Managements) in Burlington (FLB, THB, GSB, FVB, FNB, FMB, EB), Granite Savings Bank & Trust Company (1885) in Barre; Woodstock National Bank (1802) in Woodstock, First Vermont Bank, & Trust Company (1906) in Brattleboro, and Farmington National Bank (1854), Farmington, New Hampshire. The merger increased People's assets to $17 billion and gave it a larger presence in Massachusetts, Vermont, and through Evergreen Bank (Glens Falls, (1853), in New York.

The completion of the merger was delayed by regulatory review, but on May 10, 2000, Banknorth Group Inc. of Portland, Maine came into being. "The Banknorth acquisition brought into the fold eight separate community banks (Franklin Lamoille Bank N.A., The Howard Bank N.A., and First Vermont Bank N.A. in Vermont; Bank of New Hampshire under the charter of Farmington National Bank in New Hampshire, Oxford Bank & Trust, a division of Peoples Heritage Bank, and Peoples Heritage Bank in Maine; First Mass. Bank in Massachusetts, GBT, a division of First Mass Bank in Connecticut, and Evergreen Bank in New York), with 101 branches, together with an investment management firm, Stratevest, that oversaw some 4 billion in assets and a freestanding mortgage-lending unit."

The new organization renewed its program of acquisitions. "As Banknorth expanded across the map of New England, the message remained the same: community banking values, enhanced by the resources of a major banking organization, create a better bank."

Acquisitions in the period included:

- Andover Bancorp, $1.8 billion company, 15 branches in Essex and Middlesex counties, Massachusetts, 2001
- MetroWest, 17 branches in Boston western suburbs, slightly less than $1 billion in assets, 2001
- Ipswich Bancshares, 8 branches north of Boston, 2002
- Warren Bancorp, Essex County, Massachusetts, 2002
- Community Insurance Agencies, Inc. May 2002
- Bancorp Connecticut, seven branches and $663 million in assets, 2002
- American Savings Bank, New Britain, Connecticut, 2003. Added $4 billion in assets and 47 branches in central Connecticut.
- CCBT Financial Companies, Parent company of Cape Cod Bank & Trust, with $1.4 billion in assets and 26 branches in Barnstable and Plymouth Counties, Massachusetts, 2003
- Boston Federal Savings Bank, subsidiary of BostonFed Bancorp, Inc., with $1.7 billion in assets and $1.2 billion in deposits, and 16 branches in Middlesex, Norfolk, Essex, and Suffolk Counties, Massachusetts, 2004

In the 1990s and early 2000s, the emphasis was on the development of a financial services company in a true community bank setting. In 1997, the bank launched what would become Banknorth Insurance Group, and, by 2002, built the largest insurance brokerage group in New England. By 2002, Banknorth Investment Management Group had grown out of the trust business of the Bank of New Hampshire and Banknorth Vermont's consolidated trusts operation, Stratevest.

On December 31, 2001, the holding company, Banknorth Group, Inc., merged its seven subsidiary banks into one bank, Banknorth NA under the Peoples Heritage Bank charter dating back to 1852, with one OCC charter. Using locally relevant trade names retained the local identity in each state.

== Awards & Recognitions ==
For the U.S. Small Business Administration’s 2025 fiscal year, TD Bank ranked first by number of approved SBA loans in its Maine-to-Florida footprint.

At the 2025 BIG Innovation Awards, TD was recognized in the Organization category for TD Invent and in the Product category for TD Immersive Learning.

At the 2025 DataIQ Awards North America, TD received the "Best Responsible AI Programme" award for its Trustworthy AI initiative.

In Global Finance’s 2025 AI in Finance Awards, TD Bank was recognized in consumer banking for fraud detection and prevention.

At the 2025 Shorty Impact Awards, “Alicia’s Story Shared by TD” received a Gold Honor in the Financial Services category.

In the Human Rights Campaign Foundation’s 2025 Corporate Equality Index, TD Bank U.S. and TD Securities U.S. each received a score of 100 and earned the designation of being a 2025 “Equality 100 Award: Leader in LGBTQ+ Workplace Inclusion.”

In 2025, TD was recognized in the Bloomberg Financial Services Gender Equality Index for the ninth consecutive year.

In the 2026 VETS Indexes Employer Awards, TD Bank was listed as a 3-Star Employer.

At the 2026 ESG Investing Awards, TD Bank Group was named "Best Corporate Sustainability Strategy: Bank".

== TD ownership ==
=== Acquisition of Banknorth by TD ===
Former TD Banknorth logo

On August 26, 2004, TD Bank Financial Group announced it had signed an agreement with Banknorth to acquire 51% of the outstanding shares of the company for a total of $3.8 billion US.

Banknorth shareholders approved the transaction at a special meeting of shareholders on February 18, 2005, and final approval was announced on March 1, 2005. In connection with the transaction, Banknorth changed its name to TD Banknorth Inc. and reincorporated in Delaware. Its operating companies were Banknorth Connecticut, Peoples Heritage Bank (in Maine), Banknorth Massachusetts, Bank of New Hampshire, Evergreen Bank (in New York), Hudson United Bank, Banknorth Vermont, and Banknorth Insurance Group. The majority of these companies were branded as TD Banknorth of State (example "TD Banknorth of Maine").

All remaining shares of TD Banknorth were acquired by Toronto-Dominion Bank on April 20, 2007.

In July 2005, TD Banknorth announced that it had acquired Hudson United Bank, based in Mahwah, New Jersey. Hudson United had earlier acquired numerous regional banks. The acquisition significantly expanded TD Banknorth's presence in both Connecticut and New York and extended the franchise into northern New Jersey and Philadelphia as well. The acquisition was finalized on January 31, 2006, and all HUB locations were converted to TD Banknorth. Today, most of the former HUB locations, including those taken over by regional banks, are now part of TD Bank, N.A.

TD Banknorth announced acquisition of Interchange Financial Services Corp in April 2006, adding 30 branches in Bergen and Essex counties of New Jersey.

In January 2006, the company finalized acquisition of Boothby & Bartlett Company, a central Maine insurance agency in Waterville.

Banknorth added a sister company, TD Ameritrade, which was formed after the Ameritrade Holding Corporation acquired TD Waterhouse USA from Toronto-Dominion Bank in 2006. On November 20, 2006, TD Bank Financial and TD Banknorth entered into an agreement in which TD Bank would acquire all remaining shares of TD Banknorth held by the public for US$32.33 per share in cash. This was completed on April 20, 2007, and TD Banknorth became a wholly owned subsidiary of TD Bank.

On October 2, 2007, Toronto-Dominion announced its plans to acquire Cherry Hill, New Jersey–based Commerce Bancorp, pending shareholder and regulatory approval. The combined company was to be known as TD Commerce Bank, but in March 2008, Commerce Bank & Trust Company of Worcester, Massachusetts filed a lawsuit against TD Banknorth, to bar the bank from using the name TD Commerce Bank in its existing Massachusetts branches. On May 2, 2008, federal Judge F. Dennis Saylor granted a preliminary injunction, prohibiting the use of the TD Commerce name in Massachusetts branches. Toronto-Dominion then dropped plans to add the Commerce name to its banking operation and instead chose to operate all its branches as "TD Bank".

=== Rebrand to TD Bank ===
TD Bank is a successor to the Portland Savings Bank, which later became Banknorth after a series of mergers with various other New England banks. The Canada-based TD Bank Group then became majority owner in 2004 and renamed it "TD Banknorth, N.A." by adding the Canadian bank's popular "TD" initials. On May 31, 2008, TD Bank Group acquired Commerce Bank, and merged it with TD Banknorth to form TD Bank, N.A., what is now the United States subsidiary of its Canadian parent company.

In 2010, TD Bank, N.A. acquired the South Financial Group and its 172 branches across the Carolinas and Florida. South Financial was the parent company of Carolina First, with branch locations in North and South Carolina and Mercantile Bank, with branch locations in Florida, for about $191 million. South Financial's branches were converted to the TD Bank name.

In 2013, TD Bank, N.A. centralized its American headquarters in Cherry Hill, New Jersey, U.S.

In February 2016, TD Bank's consumer card division purchased the Nordstrom credit card unit for $2.2 billion. The acquisition added Nordstrom to TD's growing folio of private-label cards that includes Target, NordicTrack, and Tourneau.

On October 29, 2021, TD Bank, N.A. announced Leo Salom would succeed Greg Braca as the bank's U.S. President & CEO. Salom had been leading TD's wealth management and insurance business. Salom's role change became effective January 1, 2022.

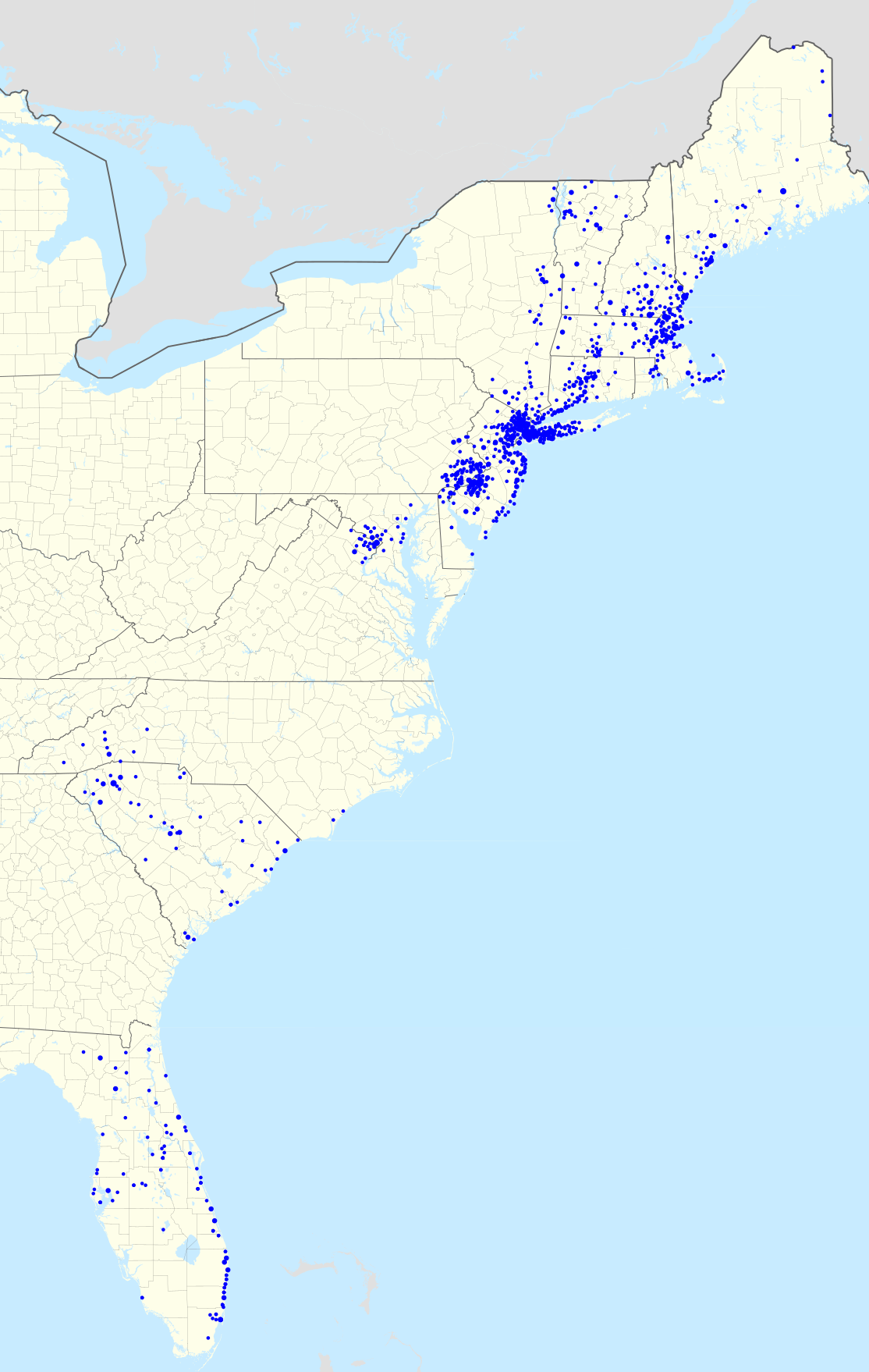
TD Bank's branch footprint after the South Financial merger

On February 28, 2022, TD Bank, N.A. announced plans to acquire Memphis, Tennessee-based First Horizon Corporation for US$13.4 billion. The deal was expected to close in 2023, but was scrapped in May 2023.

== Legal actions and public controversies ==
=== 2012 data breach ===
In October 2012, the Massachusetts attorney general announced that TD Bank misplaced unencrypted backup tapes with "extensive customer information, including Social Security numbers and bank account numbers". The bank initially refused to state how many customers were affected. After an inquiry by the attorney general, it stated 267,000 customers. The bank waited more than six months to notify customers.

=== TCPA class action lawsuit ===
In October 2015, a class action lawsuit was filed against TD Bank claiming that it violated the Telephone Consumer Protection Act of 1991. The lawsuit alleged the bank called consumers up to 10 times per day. As of July 3, 2017, all but one of the claims were dismissed by Judge Jerome B. Simandle.

=== Coin-count machine lawsuit ===
In 2016, the bank was sued for allegations that their coin counting machines, "Penny Arcades", were inaccurately counting coins. The lawsuit estimates that 26 cents out of every $100 was not counted, totaling to $9 million.

=== Financial penalties ===
Many cases of financial penalties against the company do feature mitigating factors including accidental human error at branches due to customers presenting fraudulent information; however, the company has been assessed penalties in excess of $197 million since the year 2000 for consumer, banking, investor protection, wage and privacy violations.

=== 2024 money laundering case ===
On October 10, 2024, in a landmark enforcement action, the U.S. Treasury Department's Financial Crimes Enforcement Network (FinCEN) levied a record-breaking $1.3 billion penalty against TD Bank for chronic violations of anti-money laundering (AML) laws, contributing to a total settlement of over $3 billion across multiple U.S. authorities. TD admitted to willfully neglecting its AML program for over a decade, allowing trillions of dollars in potentially suspicious transactions to go unchecked annually. TD Bank's failures ranged from inadequate monitoring of peer-to-peer transactions indicative of human trafficking and fentanyl trafficking, to facilitating over $670 million in transactions for a Chinese organized crime ring. TD agreed to a four-year independent monitorship and comprehensive reforms of its AML practices. U.S. Senator Elizabeth Warren criticized the Justice Department's decision not to charge the bank directly with money laundering and their choice to shift legal liability to TD's U.S. holding company. Warren argued that by failing to prosecute high-level executives, the DOJ is allowing banks to simply factor enforcement fines into their cost of doing business rather than taking compliance seriously. Warren and Senator Ron Wyden requested that TD identify executives responsible for AML compliance failures. On December 11, 2024, DOJ charged a Florida-based TD employee with facilitating money laundering to Colombia. In January 2025, TD announced major leadership changes and compensation cuts. Its CEO transition was accelerated, with Raymond Chun taking over on February 1, 2025. Jackie Sanjuas was named as the new global head of financial crime management.

== Sponsorships ==
In 2005, TD Banknorth announced it purchased the naming rights of what is currently the TD Garden, home of the Boston Celtics and Boston Bruins sports teams.

When TD Bank bought Commerce Bancorp in 2009, the company became title sponsor of the TD Bank Ballpark, home of the Somerset Patriots.

On August 22, 2019, TD announced its partnership with The Shed, the new arts center on Manhattan's Far West Side, as lead sponsor of the "Open Call" artist commissioning program.

On November 4, 2019, TD announced an extension of their long standing Canadian partnership with the Toronto Blue Jays into the United States with the naming rights to the team's spring training home in Dunedin, Florida, to be renamed TD Ballpark.

== See also ==
- TD Ameritrade Park Omaha (Nebraska)
- TD Bank Sports Center
- TD Garden

Miscellaneous Canadian owned US banks

- BMO Bank
- CIBC World Markets USA - no retail operations
- RBC Centura
- Scotia Capital - no retail operations
