= Toronto-Dominion Bank =

Canadian bank and financial services corporation

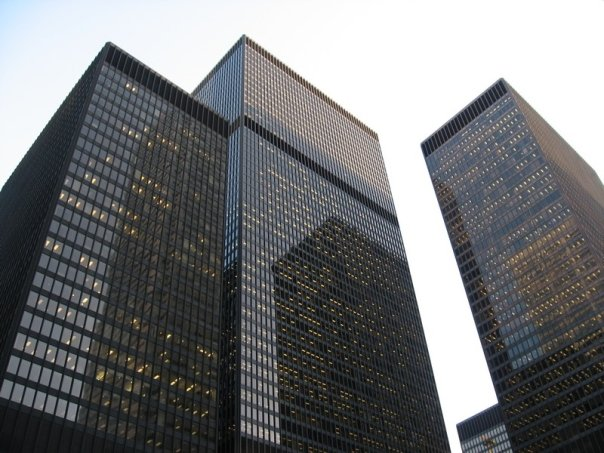
- Toronto-Dominion Centre in downtown Toronto
- Trade name: TD Bank Group
- Type: Public
- Traded as: TSX: TD; NYSE: TD; LSE: 0VL8; S&P/TSX 60 component
- ISIN: CA8911605092
- Industry: Financial services
- Predecessors: Bank of Toronto; Dominion Bank; Canada Trust
- Founded: February 1, 1955; 71 years ago (Note: The Toronto-Dominion Bank was a result of a merger between the Bank of Toronto and The Dominion Bank, finalized in 1955. The Bank of Toronto was established in 1855, whereas The Dominion Bank was established in 1869.)
- Headquarters: Toronto-Dominion Centre, Toronto, Ontario, Canada
- Key people: Raymond Chun (CEO)
- Services: Asset management; Banking; Commodities; Credit cards; Equities trading; Insurance; Investment management; Mortgage loans; Private equity; Wealth management
- Revenue: ▲CA$67.78 billion (2025)
- Net income: ▲CA$20.54 billion (2025)
- AUM: ▲CA$601.0 billion (2025)
- Total assets: ▲CA$2.095 trillion (2025)
- Total equity: ▲CA$127.8 billion (2025)
- Number of employees: 102,218 (FTE, 2025)
- Divisions: TD Canada Trust
- Subsidiaries: TD Asset Management; TD Bank (United States); TD Insurance; TD Securities; TD Waterhouse
- Website: www.td.com

Toronto-Dominion Bank (French: Banque Toronto-Dominion), doing business as TD Bank Group (Groupe Banque TD), and commonly known as just TD, is a Canadian multinational banking and financial services corporation headquartered in Toronto, Ontario. The bank was created on February 1, 1955, through the merger of the Bank of Toronto and the Dominion Bank, which were founded in 1855 and 1869, respectively. It is one of two Big Five banks of Canada founded in Toronto, the other being the Canadian Imperial Bank of Commerce.

In 2021, according to Standard & Poor's, TD Bank Group was the largest bank in Canada by total assets and also by market capitalization, a top 15 bank in North America, and the 26th largest bank in the world. In 2019, it was designated a global systemically important bank by the Financial Stability Board. In 2023, the company was ranked 43rd in the Forbes Global 2000.

The bank and its subsidiaries have more than 102,000 employees and over 28 million customers worldwide. In Canada, the bank operates through its TD Canada Trust division and has approximately 15 million customers through a network of 1,060 branches. In the United States, the company operates through their subsidiary TD Bank, N.A., which was created through the merger of TD Banknorth and Commerce Bank. TD Bank has over 10 million customers in the United States, with a network of 1,100 branches in 15 states and Washington, D.C.

== History ==
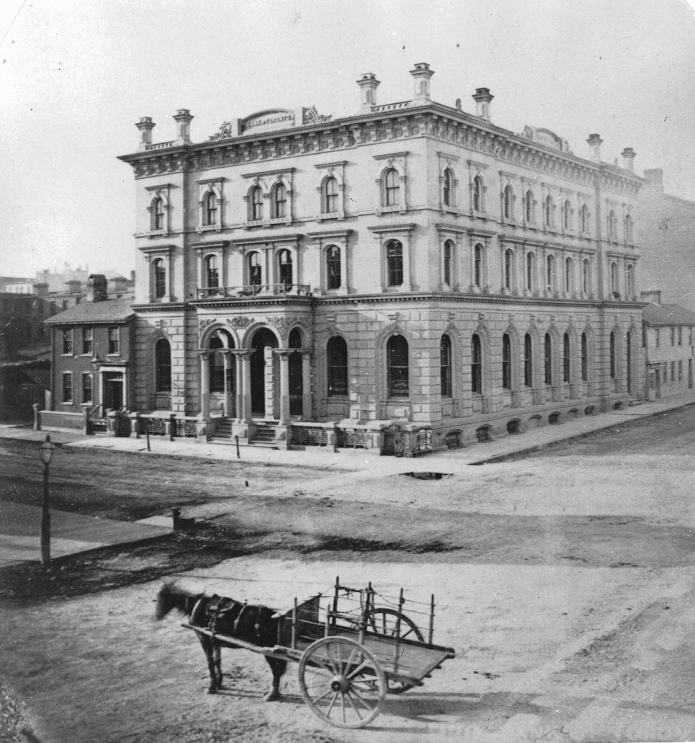
The Bank of Toronto's 1893 headquarters

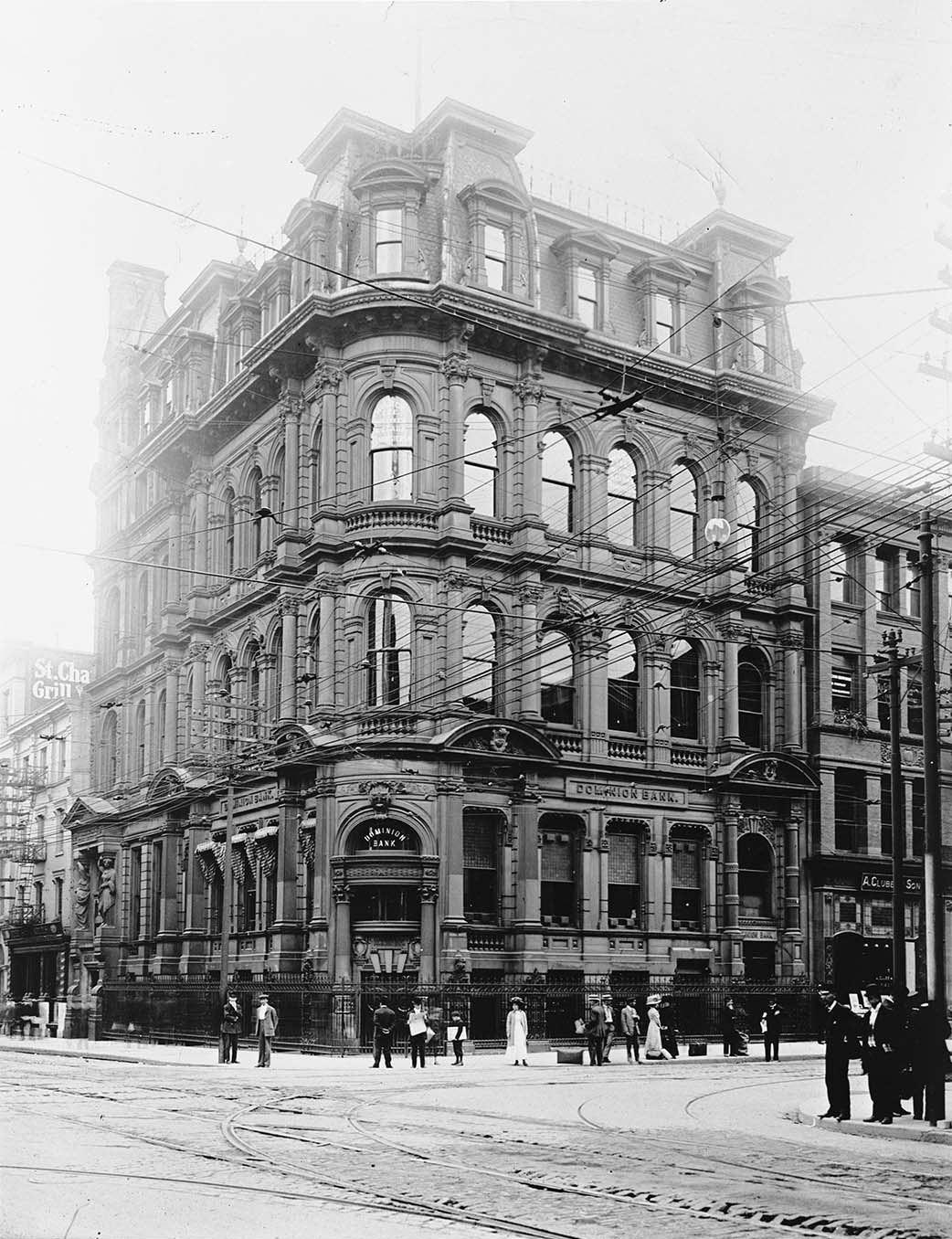
The Dominion Bank's 1879 headquarters

The predecessors of the Toronto-Dominion Bank, the Bank of Toronto, and the Dominion Bank were established in the mid-19th century, the former in 1855 and the latter in 1869. In 1954, an agreement was reached to merge the two financial institutions. The merger was later accepted by the Canadian minister of Finance on November 1, 1954, and was made official on February 1, 1955. The new institution adopted the name Toronto-Dominion Bank. The two banks were of similar size and had healthy balance sheets at the time of the merger. They were among Canada's smaller banks; their desire merge was to compete with the larger banks. The combined Toronto-Dominion Bank became the fourth largest bank in Canada, with assets of $1.1 billion.

In 1967, TD Bank opened its new head office, the Toronto-Dominion Centre in downtown Toronto. In the next year, the bank entered into a partnership with Chargex (later known as Visa Inc.). The TD Bank shield logo was unveiled to the public near the end of the decade, in 1969.

In 1976, TD Bank piloted its first automated teller machine (ATM), the TD 360, which was renamed the Green Machine, a name it continues to carry.

In 1987, Toronto Dominion Securities Inc. was established by the bank. TD Bank saw growth in the 1990s, with the acquisition of several financial assets including the commercial branches of Standard Chartered Bank of Canada. In 1992, the bank acquired the assets and branches of Central Guaranty Trust, as well as Waterhouse Investor Services in 1996.

In 1992, TD Bank and G4S Cash Solutions, a subsidiary of British security services company G4S plc, began a pilot project in Toronto that developed into a nationwide partnership in 1997. G4S Cash Solutions secured the contract to transport cash and provide first-line maintenance for the bank's ATMs.

TD Bank formed a partnership with Bank of Montreal (BMO) and Royal Bank of Canada (RBC) in 1996 to create Symcor, a private entity that offers transaction services such as item processing, statement processing and cash-management services to major banks and retail and telecommunications companies in Canada. In 2011, Symcor produces close to 675 million statements and more than two billion pages of customer statements, and processes three billion cheques annually.

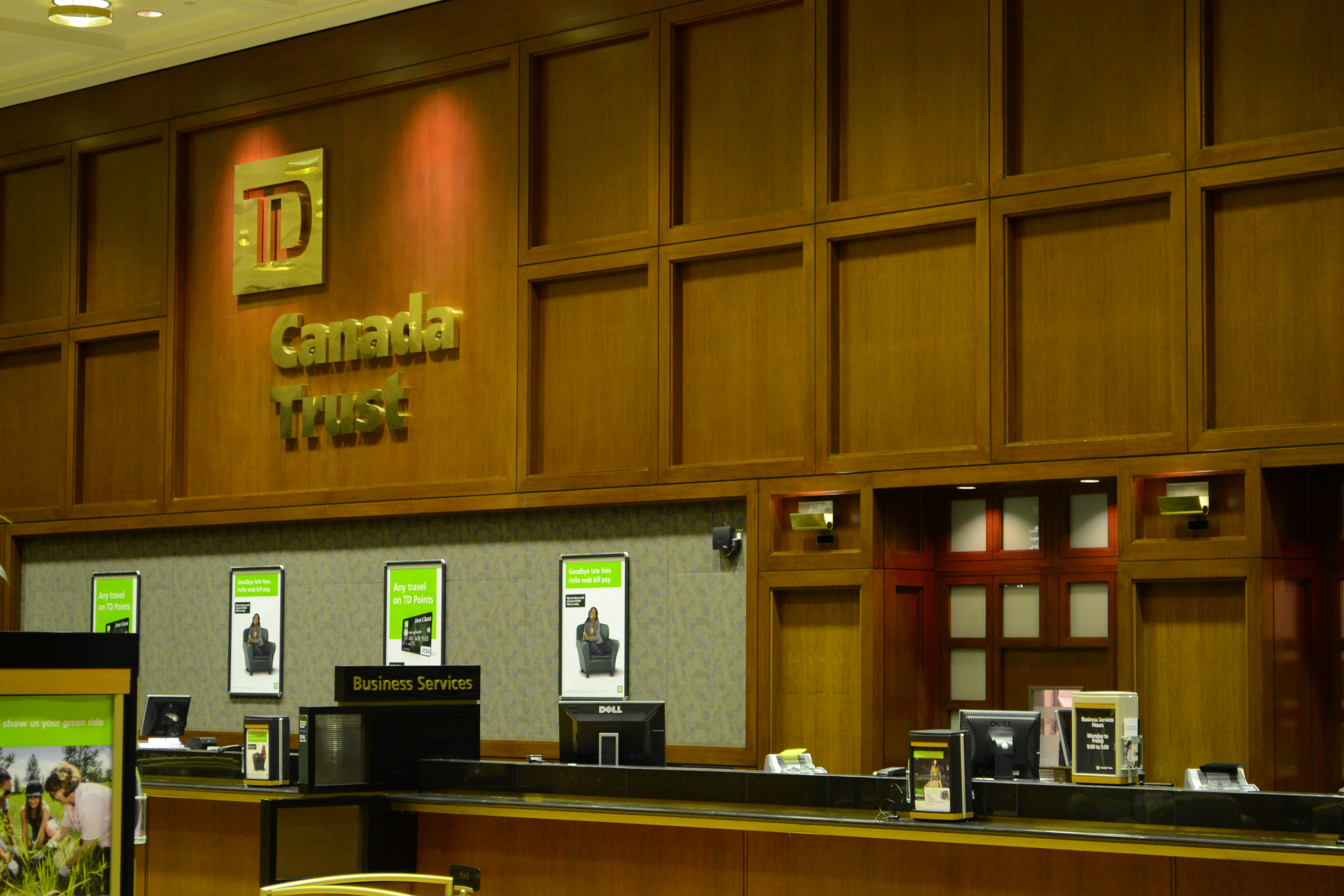
A TD Canada Trust branch. Canada Trust was acquired in 2000, and presently serves TD's Canadian commercial banking operations.

In 1998, TD Bank and the Canadian Imperial Bank of Commerce agreed to a merger. However, the Government of Canada, at the recommendation of then Minister of Finance Paul Martin, blocked the merger, as well as another proposed merger between the Bank of Montreal and the Royal Bank of Canada – believing it was not in the best interest of Canadians.

In 2000, Toronto-Dominion Securities bought Newcrest Capital for CA$224 million (75 per cent in stock and 25 per cent in cash). In the same year, TD Bank also acquired Canada Trust, re-branding most of its commercial banking operations in Canada as TD Canada Trust.

Ultimately Martin would approve the merger of TD and Canada Trust with some conditions. The new bank sold Canada Trust's MasterCard business to meet the demands of the Competition Bureau due to the fact that TD issued Visa cards at the time and Canada Trust issued MasterCard and competition rules at the time prevented a single institution from the duality of selling both brands simultaneously. The Competition Bureau also forced the sale of 13 branches, representing over 120,000 customers, in three Ontario markets where the territories of TD and Canada Trust overlapped. The vast majority of the affected branches were in the Kitchener–Waterloo area, including four in Kitchener, two in Waterloo, four in Cambridge and one in Elmira. All but one branch were sold to the Bank of Montreal for $50 million. The remaining branch in Paris, Ontario, was sold to Laurentian Bank of Canada. In all six TD branches and seven Canada Trust branches specifically changed hands to meet the Competition Bureau's requirements.

In response, TD announced it would close 275 branches, representing 4,900 employees, to adhere to the ruling and to reduce overall costs. The Canadian Federation of Independent Business said the Competition Bureau's decision to ultimately approve the deal would reduce consumer choice while eliminating the chance to create a second-tier of Canadian banking by killing off the Trust industry in Canada.

=== 21st century ===
In 2002, TD Bank acquired Stafford Trading and Letco Trading. In the following year, TD Bank acquired Laurentian Bank's retail branches west of Quebec.

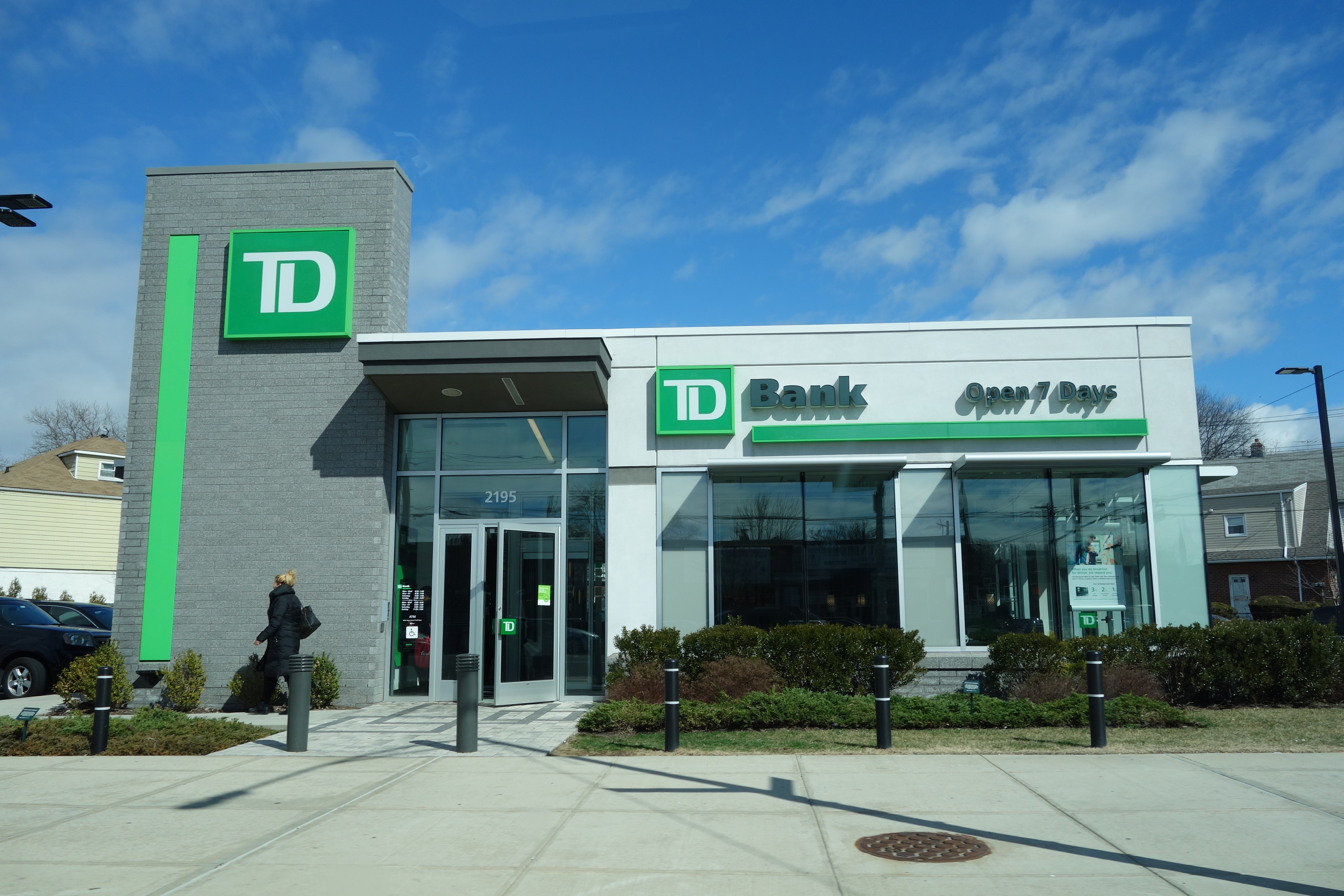
A TD Bank, N.A. branch in New York City. TD Bank expanded into the United States in the early 21st century.

In 2004, TD Bank entered the American retail banking market, announcing an agreement to acquire the majority stake of Banknorth, a New England–based bank, for a total of US$3.8 billion. Banknorth was later rebranded as TD Banknorth after the sale was finalized in March 2005.

In January 2006, the company sold its United States brokerage business branded as TD Waterhouse, which it had purchased in 1984, to Ameritrade. The business was renamed TD Ameritrade.

In April 2007, TD Bank acquired all remaining shares of TD Banknorth, transforming TD Banknorth into a fully owned subsidiary of TD Bank, and resulting in it being no longer traded on the New York Stock Exchange. In the same year, TD Bank acquired Commerce Bancorp, a bank based in Cherry Hill, New Jersey. Commerce Bancorp was later merged with TD Banknorth to form TD Bank, N.A. in 2008.

In 2010, the bank acquired the Florida-based Riverside National Bank of Fort Pierce; and the South Financial Group Inc. In the following year, TD Bank acquired Chrysler Financial, which was later rebranded as TD Auto Finance. On December 1, 2011, TD Bank acquired MBNA's Canadian credit card business. In October 2014, Affiliated Computer Services, a subsidiary of Xerox, acquired Symcor's U.S. operations from TD Bank.

After Moody's Investor Service downgraded the credit worthiness of Royal Bank of Canada to Aa1 on December 13, 2010, TD Bank remained the only one of Canada's Big Five banks with a top Aaa credit rating at that point in the Great Recession (at the time, CIBC was Aa2, Scotiabank was Aa1 and Bank of Montreal was Aa2). It is also ranked number 1 by profit in the Top 1000 2012 listing.

From 2014 to 2015, TD went through a minor restructuring which included job cuts and other cost-cutting measures, under the leadership of Bharat Masrani, which kept the stock price on a stable upward trend.

In April 2020 it became apparent that TD Bank was a significant secured creditor involved in the voluntary administration of the Virgin Australia airline, which has debts of A$7 billion. The Virgin administrators declared TD Bank held an all present and after-acquired property charge over substantially the whole of the property of certain entities of the airline.

In March 2021, TD Bank agreed to buy Headlands Tech Global Markets LLC from Headlands Technologies to enhance its automated fixed income trading platform.

Bloomberg reported that TD Bank, along with Canada's other large banks, added ESG measures to their chief executive officers' compensation plans.

On February 28, 2022, TD made a US$13.4 billion offer for First Horizon Corp., with 1,159 branches, expected to be completed in February 2023. This would be the second-largest bank deal since the Great Recession in the United States. As of December 31, 2021, TD had US$423.65 billion in U.S. assets, making it the ninth largest bank in the United States. If completed the deal would give TD 1,560 branches in 22 U.S. states. On May 4, 2023, it was announced that the deal would not proceed due to regulatory uncertainty.

In July 2022, TD Bank announced it was evaluating a takeover of US brokerage firm Cowen. The following month, TD agreed to buy Cowen for US$1.3 billion in an all-cash deal, paying Cowen shareholders US$39 per share. TD announced that Cowen chair and CEO Jeffrey Solomon would join the senior leadership of TD's securities division following the acquisition, and that the combined business will be known as TD Cowen, headed by Solomon. To fund the purchase, TD sold over 28 million non-voting common shares of Charles Schwab Corporation, reducing its stake in the company from 13.4 percent to 12 percent.

In August 2023, TD Bank Group announced that it was expanding its share repurchase program. It planned to repurchase 90 million shares (about 4.9 percent of outstanding shares).

Baharat Masarani announced his retirement in September 2024, having been CEO since 2014. In February 2025, Raymond Chun took over as CEO of TD Bank Group. In the same month, Toronto-Dominion Bank indicated it aimed to sell its 10.1% stake in Charles Schwab for about 14.6 billion USD. This followed the company's $3.09-billion money-laundering fine from U.S. federal regulators and the Department of Justice. The bank planned to use 8 billion CAD of the proceeds for share buybacks and sought to invest the rest in growth as it simplified its U.S. operations.

In May 2025, TD Bank announced the closure of 38 branches across 10 states and Washington, D.C., effective June 5, 2025. This decision was part of a broader industry trend, with 272 bank branches closed nationally in the first quarter of 2025 alone.

In the 2026 Canada Digital Banking and Credit Card Mobile App Satisfaction Study conducted by JD Power, TD Bank ranked first among Canadian banks for mobile banking app customer satisfaction, receiving a score of 690.

== Sponsorships ==
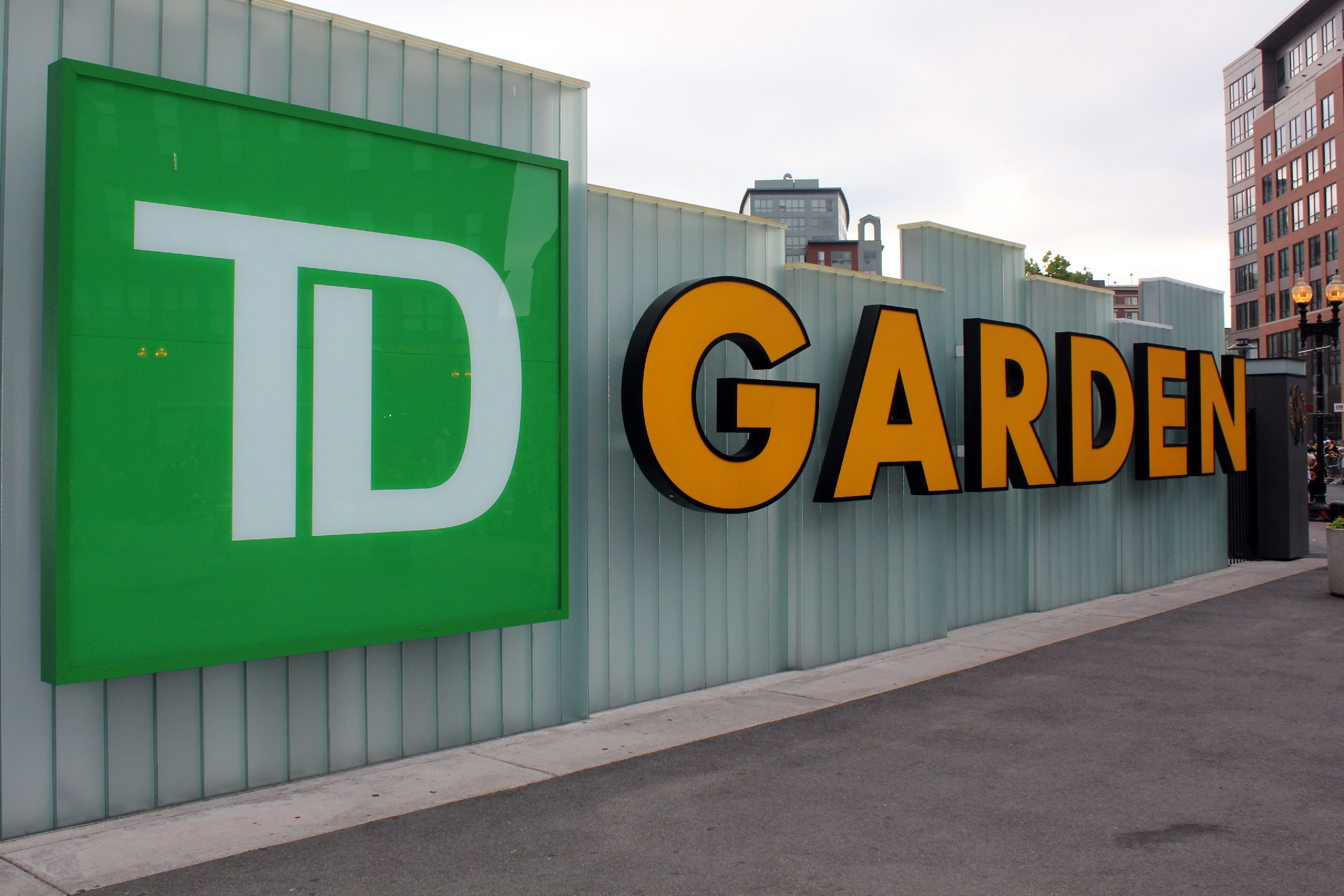
A sign for TD Garden, a multi-sport venue in Boston. TD Bank has held the naming rights for the venue since 2005.

Toronto-Dominion Bank, and its subsidiaries, are title sponsors for a number of sporting venues in Canada and the United States. TD Bank holds the naming rights to several multi-sport indoor arenas, including TD Garden in Boston, Massachusetts. TD Banknorth acquired the naming rights for the Boston-based venue in 2005, with the venue being known as TD Banknorth Garden until 2007. After TD Banknorth was merged to form TD Bank, N.A., the venue dropped Banknorth from the name and was branded as TD Garden. The Boston Celtics and Boston Bruins, which play at the venue, announced a 20-year extension of the TD Garden naming rights deal in January 2023. The deal extends to 2045.

Other indoor stadiums sponsored by TD Bank include TD Station in Saint John, New Brunswick; TD Coliseum in Hamilton, TD Place Arena in Ottawa, Ontario, and TD Civic Centre in Brantford, Ontario. TD Place Arena forms a part of TD Place at Lansdowne Park. The bank also holds the naming rights to the outdoor stadium at TD Place, known as TD Place Stadium. Other outdoor stadiums sponsored by TD Bank include TD Stadium in London, Ontario, and TD Ballpark in Dunedin, Florida.

== Controversies ==
In 2010, a suspicious customer trading at TD Bank in the UK was fined £750,000 (US$1.16 million) by the Financial Services Authority for intentionally mismarking his trading positions.

News outlets reported the bank's policy regarding ordinary Iranian-Canadian citizens in July 2012. About 100 personal bank accounts had been closed, citing the recent ambiguous Special Economic Measure Regulation of the Canadian government. A family in Vancouver was forced to refinance a $250,000 house mortgage in 60 days to avoid foreclosure.

A TD Bank document became the focus of a 2012 contempt hearing in Miami federal court. In a civil lawsuit against TD Bank, a jury found the bank liable for aiding alleged Ponzi schemer Scott Rothstein's US$1.4 billion fraud.

In 2015, the Canadian news website the Halifax Examiner reported that a political action committee (PAC) established by TD Bank had donated over $50,000 to the campaigns of anti-LGBT rights politicians in the United States. The article suggested that this was problematic given TD Bank's status as a sponsor of 41 LGBT Pride events across North America; TD Bank made no comment. In response to this article, on October 6, 2015, a motion was brought at the annual general meeting of Halifax Pride to sever ties with TD Bank if it did not provide a satisfactory response to the concerns; the motion was ultimately defeated.

On March 10, 2017, the Canadian Broadcasting Corporation's (CBC) news programme Go Public reported that TD Bank employees had admitted that, under pressure to achieve sales targets, they had increased customers' lines of credit, overdraft amounts, and Visa credit limits without advising them which is against the law. One TD financial adviser says she "invested clients' savings into funds which were not suitable, because of the SR [sales revenue] pressure". Another admitted downplaying the risk of products saying: "I was forced to lie to customers, just to meet the sales revenue targets." In an internal letter to employees, Andy Pilkington, executive vice-president of branch banking, wrote: "We don't believe the [CBC] story is an accurate portrayal of our culture," but the report provided an opportunity "to pause, reflect and ask ourselves ... how we can do better for our people and our customers." The bank's stock lost 5.55 percent of its value on March 10, posting its worst day since 2009.

In 2017, Greenpeace announced a campaign against TD's financing of tar sands on the basis of environmental as well as human rights issues. Their campaign stated that tar-sand pipelines are not consistent with a transition to a lower-carbon world and that many Indigenous and First Nations communities along the pipeline routes have not given permission for the projects.

Following his ended relationship to private-banking with JPMorgan, which was headed by his friend Jes Staley, and his relationships later for over 20 years through Thomas Bowers at the Citi Private Bank and subsequently the Thomas Bowers headed private wealth management division of Deutsche Bank from 2013 until early 2019, (Note: Thomas Bowers left Deutsche Bank in 2015 to be Chief Operating Officer (COO) at Starwood Capital Group and in 2016 was a director on the board at Opus Bank.) Jeffrey Epstein established a close relationship during 2019, allegedly through Darren Indyke, with wealth management and private banking at TD Bank which was Epstein's bank while he was under investigations in the United States, Brazil, and France at the time of his death in August 2019.

In February 2022, TD Bank froze two personal bank accounts holding $1.1 million in funds, deposited to support the vaccine mandate protests in Ottawa.

TD Bank has faced serious regulatory violations relating to money laundering. The bank has been heavily criticized for its role in the fentanyl and opioid epidemic in the United States, particularly in assistance provided by bank employees to drug traffickers. The allegations have prompted calls for CEO Bharat Masrani to step down, and has severely tarnished TD Bank's reputation in the United States. The fines in the United States are expected to exceed US$2 billion, which would be the most a Canadian bank has ever been fined. The bank was also fined CA$9.19 million by FINTRAC, which is much more reluctant than the United States Department of Justice to penalize large institutions such as TD Bank because of the power and influence TD Bank has over Canadian politicians and government policy. The CA$9.19 million fine is the largest fine ever imposed by FINTRAC.

On October 10, 2024, it was revealed that TD was required to pay US$3 billion in fines due to charges that it failed to properly monitor money laundering by drug cartels, particularly by a Chinese organized crime ring based in Flushing, Queens. TD will pay US$1.3 billion to the US Treasury Department’s Financial Crimes Enforcement Network, a record fine for a bank. TD must also pay US$1.8 billion to the US Justice Department. U.S. senators Elizabeth Warren and Ron Wyden requested that TD identify executives responsible for anti-money laundering compliance failures.

== Leadership ==
=== President ===
1. Albert Clifford Ashforth, February 1, 1955 – December 6, 1960
2. Allen Thomas Lambert, December 6, 1960 – September 1972
3. Richard Murray Thomson, September 1972 – April 30, 1978
4. John Allan Boyle, May 1, 1978 – May 31, 1981
5. Robert Willem Korthals, June 1, 1981 – January 31, 1995
6. Alexander Charles Baillie, February 1, 1995 – July 5, 2000
7. William Edmund Clark, July 6, 2000 – October 31, 2014
8. Bharat Masrani, November 1, 2014 – January 31, 2025
9. Raymond Chun, February 1, 2025 – present

=== Chairman of the board ===
1. Byron Samuel Vanstone, February 1, 1955 – December 31, 1956
2. Allen Thomas Lambert, 1961 – April 30, 1978
3. Richard Murray Thomson, May 1, 1978 – January 31, 1998
4. Alexander Charles Baillie, February 1, 1998 – April 3, 2003
5. John Munro Thompson, April 3, 2003 – December 31, 2010
6. Brian Michael Levitt, January 1, 2011 – January 31, 2024
7. Alan Nelson MacGibbon, February 1, 2024 – September 1, 2025
8. John Brent MacIntyre, September 1, 2025 – present

== See also ==
- List of banks and credit unions in Canada
- List of banks in the Americas
- List of largest banks
