= List of trust and loan companies in Canada =

The following is a list of trust companies that operate or that have operated in Canada. Historically, trust companies were one of the "four pillars" of the Canadian financial system, along with banks, insurance companies, and investment brokerages. The country's first trust company was the Toronto General Trusts Corporation, which received its charter in 1872. By the turn of the century, 14 trust companies had received charters.

For much of the 20th century, Canada's trust companies were controlled by the major banks through interlocking directorates. However, revisions to the Bank Act in 1967 forbade individuals from sitting on a bank and trust company board simultaneously; this had been a recommendation in the 1964 Report of the Royal Commission on Banking and Finance (or Porter Commission). Until 1991, Canadian banks were barred from performing trust duties. Amendments to the Bank Act in 1991 allowed bank holding companies for the first time to acquire trust companies. Since 1991, most of Canada's major trust companies have been acquired by banks. Canadian trust companies with federal incorporations are regulated by the Trust and Loan Companies Act.

== Trust companies owned by big five banks ==
The following list is of trust companies operated currently by Canada's Big Five banks:

=== Bank of Montreal ===
- BMO Trust Company

=== Bank of Nova Scotia ===
- Bank of Nova Scotia Trust Company
- Montreal Trust Company
- National Trust Company

=== Canadian Imperial Bank of Commerce ===
- CIBC Trust Corporation (formerly Morgan Trust Company of Canada)

=== Royal Bank of Canada ===
- Royal Trust Company

=== Toronto-Dominion Bank ===
- Canada Trust

== Other subsidiary trust companies ==
- B2B Trustco – B2B Bank
- Central 1 Trust Company – Central 1 Credit Union
- Cidel Trust Company – Cidel Bank
- Citizens Trust Company – Vancity
- Community Trust Company – Questrade
- Computershare Trust Company of Canada – Computershare
- Concentra Trust – Equitable Bank
- Desjardins Trust – Desjardins Group
- Equitable Trust – Equitable Bank
- Fiduciary Trust Company of Canada – Franklin Templeton Investments
- FNB Trust – First Nations Bank of Canada
- Industrial Alliance Trust – IA Financial
- Investors Group Trust – Investors Group
- Laurentian Trust of Canada – Laurentian Bank of Canada
- LBC Trust – Laurentian Bank of Canada
- Manulife Trust Company – Manulife
- Natcan Trust Company – National Bank of Canada
- Northern Trust Company of Canada – Northern Trust
- Solus Trust Company – Raymond James Financial
- State Street Trust Company Canada – State Street Corporation
- Sun Life Financial Trust – Sun Life
- TSX Trust Company – TMX Group

== Independent trust companies ==
- Effort Trust Company
- Home Trust Company
- Legacy Private Trust
- Odyssey Trust Company
- Peace Hills Trust Company
- Peoples Trust Company

== Defunct trust companies ==
Company	Origin	Established	Disestablished	Fate
Acadia Trust Company	Truro	1918	1961	Acquired by the Montreal Trust Company
Agricultural Savings and Loan Company	London	3 May 1872	1911	Acquired by the Ontario Loan & Debenture Company
Atlantic Trust Company of Canada				
Bankers' Trust Company	Montreal	20 May 1905		Acquired by Royal Trust
Barclays Trust Company of Canada	Montreal	11 March 1931	1957	Acquired by Royal Trust
Brantford Trust Company	Brantford	16 December 1907	31 August 1927	Acquired by Canada Permanent Trust
British Canadian Trust Company	Lethbridge	1901	1961	Failed; assets acquired by Canada Trust
British Columbia Permanent Loan Company	Vancouver	12 March 1909	1927	Acquired by Canada Permanent Mortgage
British Mortgage & Trust Company	Stratford	5 October 1877	26 September 1965	Acquired by Victoria and Grey Trust
British Western Trust Corporation	Regina	3 January 1913		
Brockville Trust & Savings Company	Brockville	11 May 1885	1955	Acquired by the Montreal Trust Company
Building and Loan Association			15 December 1899	Merged with Union Loan to form the Toronto Mortgage Company
Canada Landed and National Investment Company Limited	Toronto	12 February 1891	30 December 1927	Acquired by Canada Permanent Mortgage
Canada Landed Credit Company		1858	12 February 1891	Merged with National Investment Company to form Canada Landed and National Investment Company
Canada Permanent Mortgage Corporation	Toronto	1 March 1855	31 December 1985	Merged into Canada Trustco Mortgage Corporation
Canada Permanent Trust	Toronto	7 March 1913	31 December 1985	Merged into Canada Trust
Canadian Financiers Trust Company	Vancouver	1907		
Canadian Guaranty Trust Company	Brandon	1906		
Canadian First Mortgage Corporation		27 September 1963	31 October 1980	Acquired by Victoria and Grey
Canadian Mortgage Investment Company	Toronto	11 August 1899	1926	Originally the Canadian Birkbeck Investment and Savings. Name changed in 1912. Acquired by the Debentures and Securities Corporation.
Canadian Savings & Loan Company	London	2 September 1875	29 December 1905	Acquired by Huron & Erie
Canadian Trust Company	Montreal	1905	1957	Acquired by the Montreal Trust Company
CanWest Trust Company of Canada				
Capital Trust Corporation, Limited	Ottawa	1 April 1912	12 June 1947	Acquired by Guaranty Trust
Central and Eastern Trust	Halifax	21 July 1976	1 March 1981	Merged with Federal Trust to become the Central Trust Company
Central and Nova Scotia Trust	Halifax	1974	21 July 1976	Merged with Eastern Canada Savings to form Central and Eastern Trust
Central Canada Loan and Savings Company	Toronto	7 March 1884		
Central Guaranty Trust	Halifax	31 December 1988	31 December 1992	Falied
Central Trust Company	Halifax	1 March 1981	31 December 1988	Merged with Guaranty Trust, Yorkshire Trust, and Nova Scotia Savings to form Central Guaranty Trust
Central Trust Company of Canada	Moncton	24 April 1920	1974	Merged with Nova Scotia Trust to form Central and Nova Scotia Trust
Chartered Trust Company	Toronto	20 July 1905	29 November 1963	Merged with Eastern Trust to form Eastern & Chartered Trust
Colonial Investment and Loan Company	Toronto	14 June 1900	1928	Liquidated
Commercial Trust Company	Halifax		1907	Acquired by the Montreal Trust Company
Community Trusts Corporation	Chatham	26 April 1928	9 April 1938	Acquired by Canada Trust
Consolidated Trusts Corporation	London	25 June 1903	21 January 1930	Acquired by Canada Trust
County Savings and Loan Company		26 November 1964	30 June 1974	Merged with Federal Trust and Savings to form the Federal Trust Company
Crédit foncier franco-canadien	Montreal	24 July 1880	1 January 1987	Acquired by the Montreal Trust Company
Crown Savings and Loan Company	Petrolia	30 January 1882	24 December 1935	Acquired by the Industrial Mortgage and Trust Company
Crown Trust Company	Montreal	29 May 1909	21 May 1946	Acquired by Trusts & Guarantee, which became Crown Trust and Guarantee, and later Crown Trust
Debenture Company of Canada, Limited	Regina	1914		
Dominion Savings & Investment Society	London	20 April 1872	29 August 1922	Acquired by Huron & Erie
Dominion Trust Company	Vancouver	1 April 1912	1943	
East Lambton Farmers' Loan and Savings Company	Forest	19 December 1891	1934	Acquired by the Industrial Mortgage and Trust Company
Eastern & Chartered Trust Company	Toronto	29 November 1963	20 December 1967	Acquired by Canada Permanent Trust
Eastern Canada Savings and Loan Company	Halifax	11 November 1887	21 July 1976	Merged with Central and Nova Scotia Trust to form Central and Eastern Trust
Eastern Trust Company	Halifax	1893	29 November 1963	Merged with Chartered Trust to form Eastern & Chartered Trust
Empire Loan Company	Winnipeg	8 February 1904		
Equitable Trust Company	Winnipeg		10 April 1958	Acquired by Guaranty Trust
Federal Trust Company		30 June 1974	1976	Merged with Central and Eastern Trust to become Central Trust
Federal Trust and Savings Company		4 October 1972	30 June 1974	Merged with County Savings and Loan to form the Federal Trust Company
Fidelity Trust Company	Winnipeg	1909	1983	Failed
Fidelity Trusts Company of Ontario	London	23 March 1910	30 June 1941	Moved to Niagara Falls in 1928. Acquired by Guaranty Trust.
Financial Trust Company			1988	Failed
Fort Garry Trust Company	Winnipeg		1 October 1982	Acquired by Fidelity Trust
Great West Permanent Loan Company	Winnipeg	19 May 1909	1927	Liquidated
Grey and Bruce Loan Company	Owen Sound	10 May 1889	8 April 1926	Merged with Owen Sound Loan and Savings to form Grey and Bruce Trust and Savings
Grey and Bruce Trust and Savings Company	Owen Sound	8 April 1926	9 November 1950	Merged with Victoria Trust to form Victoria and Grey Trust
Guaranty Trust Company	Windsor	12 June 1925	31 December 1988	Merged with Central Trust, Yorkshire Trust, and Nova Scotia Savings to form Central Guaranty Trust
Guelph and Ontario Investment and Savings Society	Guelph	19 January 1876	1 December 1949	Acquired by Huron & Erie
Guelph Trust Company	Guelph	26 May 1917	1 December 1949	Acquired by Canada Trust
Halton and Peel Trust and Savings Company	Oakville	20 January 1955	30 June 1971	Acquired by Waterloo Trust
Hamilton Provident & Loan Society	Hamilton	6 June 1871	13 October 1926	Acquired by Huron & Erie
Hamilton Trust and Savings Corp.	Hamilton	4 July 1963	31 December 1977	Acquired by Canada Permanent Trust
Huron & Erie Mortgage Corporation	London	15 March 1864	1 January 2005	Renamed Canada Trustco Mortgage Corporation in 1976. Merged with its subsidiary Canada Trust, which continued.
Huron and Lambton Loan & Savings Company	Sarnia	1 November 1877	4 January 1907	Acquired by Lambton Loan & Investment
Imperial Canadian Trust Company	Winnipeg	24 March 1911	1927	Liquidated
Imperial Trust Company	Montreal			
Imperial Trusts Company of Canada	Toronto	23 June 1887	24 April 1934	Acquired by Premier Trust
Industrial Mortgage and Trust Company	Sarnia	20 August 1889	17 July 1969	Acquired by Royal Trust
Interior Trust Company	Winnipeg	6 March 1918		Acquired by Mutual Life; became Mutual Trust Company in 1985. Now Sun Life Financial Trust.
International Savings & Mortgage Corporation	Winnipeg	11 May 1920		Acquired by Metropolitan Trust
Kent Trust & Savings Company	Chatham	12 December 1963	30 June 1969	Acquired by Metropolitan Trust
Lambton Loan & Investment Company	Sarnia	27 March 1847	31 October 1978	Acquired by Victoria and Grey
Lambton Trust Company, Limited	Sarnia	26 April 1928	31 October 1978	Acquired by Victoria and Grey
Landed Banking & Loan Company	Hamilton	15 December 1876	18 October 1944	Acquired by Canada Permanent Mortgage
Lincoln Trust and Savings Company	Niagara Falls	4 March 1964	10 December 1976	Acquired by Canada Trust
London and Western Trusts Company	London	17 September 1896	13 February 1947	Acquired by Canada Trust
London Loan & Savings Company of Canada	London	2 May 1877	29 August 1929	Acquired by Huron & Erie
London Permanent Building & Savings Society	London		18 March 1895	Acquired by Huron & Erie
Manitoba Trust Company	Winnipeg	1896	July 1900	Acquired by National Trust
Marcil Trust Company				
Maritime Trust Company	Saint John	6 April 1911	18 April 1958	Acquired by the Montreal Trust Company
Mercantile Trust Company of Canada, Limited	Hamilton	1907	August 1924	Acquired by National Trust
Metropolitan Trust Company	Toronto	7 June 1962	27 June 1968	Acquired by York Trust, which continued under the Metropolitan Trust name.
Midland Loan and Savings Company	Port Hope	5 July 1872	4 December 1947	Acquired by Canada Permanent Mortgage
Montreal Loan and Mortgage Company	Montreal		1946	Acquired by Canada Permanent Mortgage
Mortgage Corporation of Nova Scotia		1900	1945	Acquired by Eastern Canada Savings & Loan
National Investment Company of Canada		21 August 1882	1891	Merged with the Canada Landed Credit Company to form the Canada Landed and National Investment Company
Niagara Falls Loan and Savings Company	Niagara Falls	5 March 1894	13 January 1944	Acquired by Guaranty Trust
North American Trust Company				Acquired by Trust général du Canada
Northern Trusts Company	Winnipeg	1902	1947	Acquired by the Montreal Trust Company
Nova Scotia Savings & Loan Company	Halifax	1964	1988	Merged with Central Trust, Guaranty Trust, and Yorkshire Trust to form Central Guaranty Trust
Nova Scotia Trust Company	Halifax	3 May 1912	1974	
Okanagan Trust Company	Kelowna		27 March 1961	Acquired by Royal Trust
Ontario Investment Association	London	May 1880		
Ontario Loan and Debenture Company	London	26 September 1870	1968	Acquired by Royal Trust
Osler & Nanton Trust Company	Winnipeg	1911	25 March 1954	Acquired by Toronto General Trusts
Ottawa Trust and Deposit Company	Ottawa	23 January 1896	1903	Acquired by Toronto General Trusts
Ottawa Valley Trust Company	Ottawa	18 December 1945	19 June 1952	Acquired by Toronto General Trusts
Owen Sound Loan and Savings Company	Owen Sound	1 April 1889	8 April 1926	Merged with Grey and Bruce Loan to form Grey and Bruce Trust and Savings
Peoples Loan & Savings Corporation	London	22 June 1892	17 January 1931	Acquired by Huron & Erie
Premier Trust Company	London	2 April 1913	1983	Acquired by Victoria and Grey
Prenor Trust Company				
Prince Edward Island Trust Company	Charlottetown	1930	1957	Acquired by the Montreal Trust Company
Provident Investment Company	Toronto	2 November 1893	1967	Acquired by Western Savings and Loan
Prudential Trust Company, Limited	Montreal	1909		
Quebec Savings and Trust Company	Montreal		23 March 1936	Acquired by Chartered Trust
Real Estate Loan Company of Canada Limited	Toronto	17 September 1879	2 February 1945	Acquired by Canada Permanent Mortgage
Reliance Loan and Savings Company of Ontario	Toronto	2 March 1893	21 April 1913	Merged with Standard Loan to form Standard Reliance Mortgage
Royal Loan and Savings Company	Brantford	24 March 1876	4 March 1927	Acquired by Canada Permanent Mortgage
Royal Standard Loan Company	London	August 1877		Acquired by London Loan
Saskatchewan General Trusts Corporation	Regina	26 January 1911		
Saskatchewan Loan and Investment Company	Moose Jaw	17 December 1906		
Saskatchewan Mortgage and Trust Company	Regina	1908	1928	Acquired by Toronto General Trusts
Security Loan & Savings Company	St Catharines	12 March 1870	23 June 1937	Acquired by Premier Trust
Sherbrooke Trust Company	Sherbrooke			Acquired by Trust général du Canada
Southern Loan & Savings Company	St Thomas		31 May 1927	Acquired by Huron & Erie
Standard Loan Company	Orangeville	14 February 1873	21 April 1913	Merged with Reliance Loan and Savings to form Standard Reliance Mortgage
Standard Reliance Mortgage Corporation	Toronto	21 April 1913	1919	Falied?
Standard Trusts Company	Winnipeg		18 December 1929	Acquired by London & Western
Sterling Trusts Corporation	Regina	19 May 1911		Moved to Toronto in 1913. Acquired by Trust général du Canada.
Toronto General Trusts	Toronto	2 March 1872	30 November 1961	Merged into Canada Permanent
Toronto Mortgage Company	Toronto	15 December 1899	26 February 1959	Acquired by Canada Permanent Mortgage
Toronto Savings & Loan Company	Peterborough	15 June 1885	1946	Acquired by Grey & Bruce
Traders Trust Company	Winnipeg			
Trusts & Guarantee Company of Canada	Toronto	24 February 1897	1983	Changed name to Crown Trust and Guarantee on 21 May 1946, and to Crown Trust on 23 December 1947. Failed in 1983.
Trust & Loan Company of Canada	London, England	1845	1978	Formed by Royal Charter. Renamed Toronto and London Investment Company in 1951. Acquired by Slater, Walker of Canada.
Trust général du Canada				
Trusts Corporation of Ontario		27 December 1888	1899	Acquired by Toronto General Trusts
Union Loan and Savings Company	Toronto		15 December 1899	Merged with the Building and Loan Association to form the Toronto Mortgage Company
Union Trust Company	Toronto	7 August 1901	30 December 1933	Acquired by the Trusts & Guarantee Company of Canada
United Trust Company		13 August 1964	31 March 1977	Acquired by Royal Trust
Valiant Trust Company				
Vanguard Trust of Canada				
Victoria & Grey Trust Company	Lindsay	9 November 1950	31 August 1984	Acquired by National Trust
Victoria Trust & Savings Company	Lindsay	4 September 1897	9 November 1950	Merged with Grey and Bruce Trust to form Victoria and Grey Trust
Waterloo Trust and Savings Company	Waterloo	7 April 1913		Acquired by Canada Trust
Wellington Trust Company			1 January 1992	Acquired by the Montreal Trust Company
Western Counties Permanent Building & Savings Society			1866	Acquired by Huron & Erie
Winnipeg General Trusts Company	Winnipeg	1899	1902	Acquired by Toronto General Trusts
York Trust & Savings Corporation	Toronto	11 October 1962	31 October 1978	Renamed Metropolitan Trust in 1968. Acquired by Victoria and Gray.
Yorkshire Trust Company	Huddersfield, England	1888	31 December 1988	Merged with Central Trust, Guaranty Trust, and Nova Scotia Savings to form Central Guaranty Trust

== Gallery of trust company headquarters ==
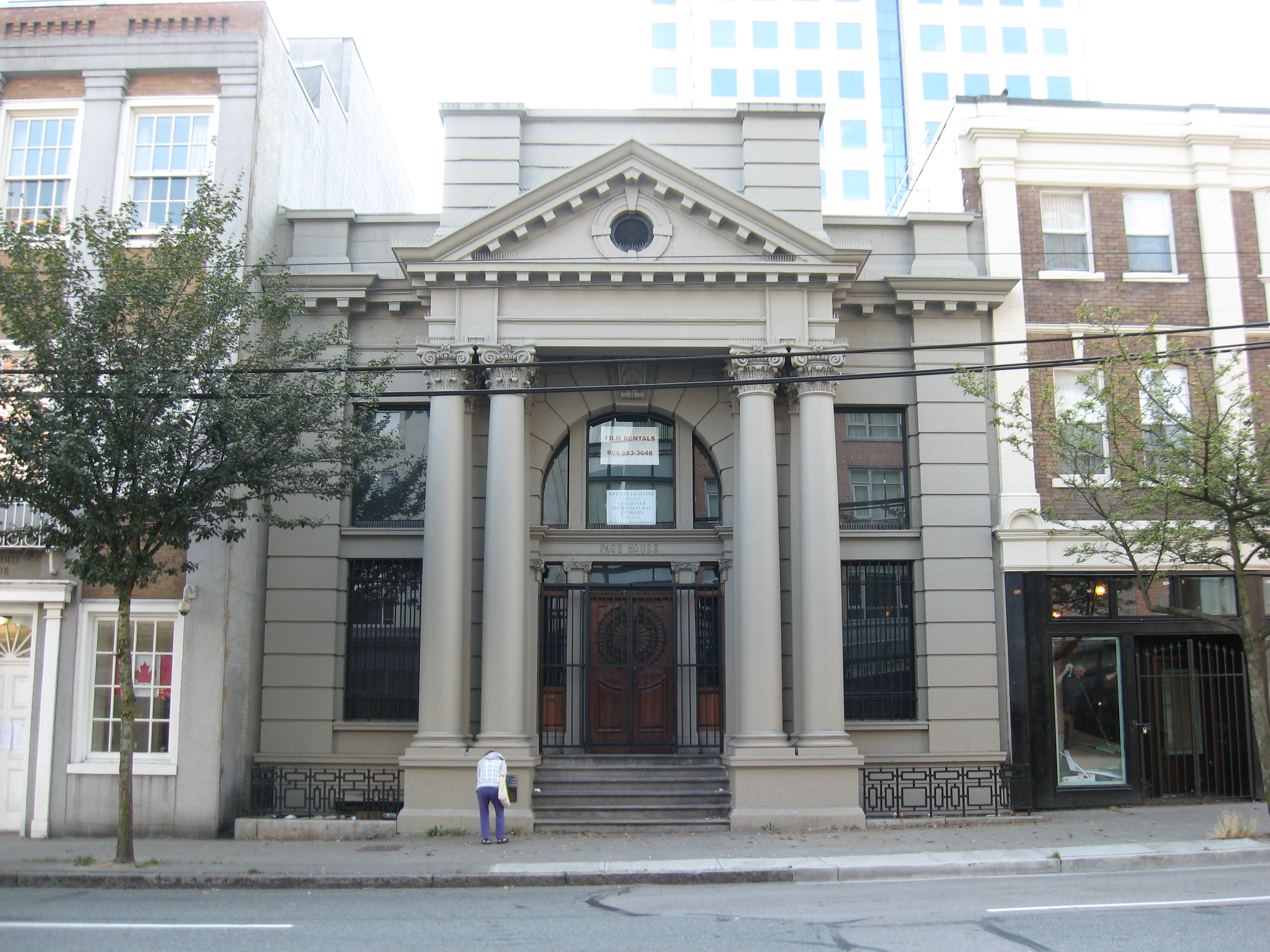
BC Permanent Loan (Vancouver)

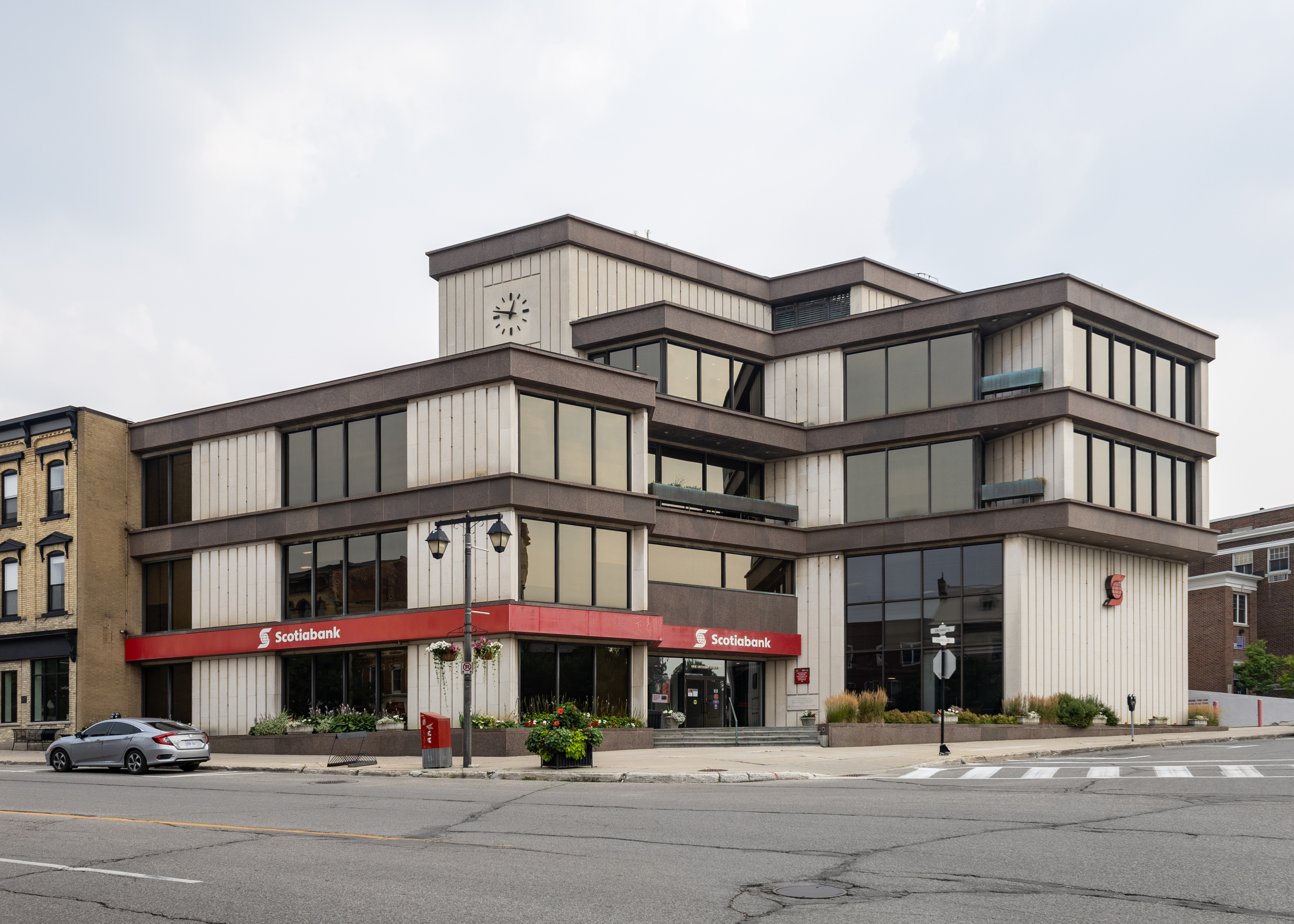
British Mortgage & Trust (Stratford)

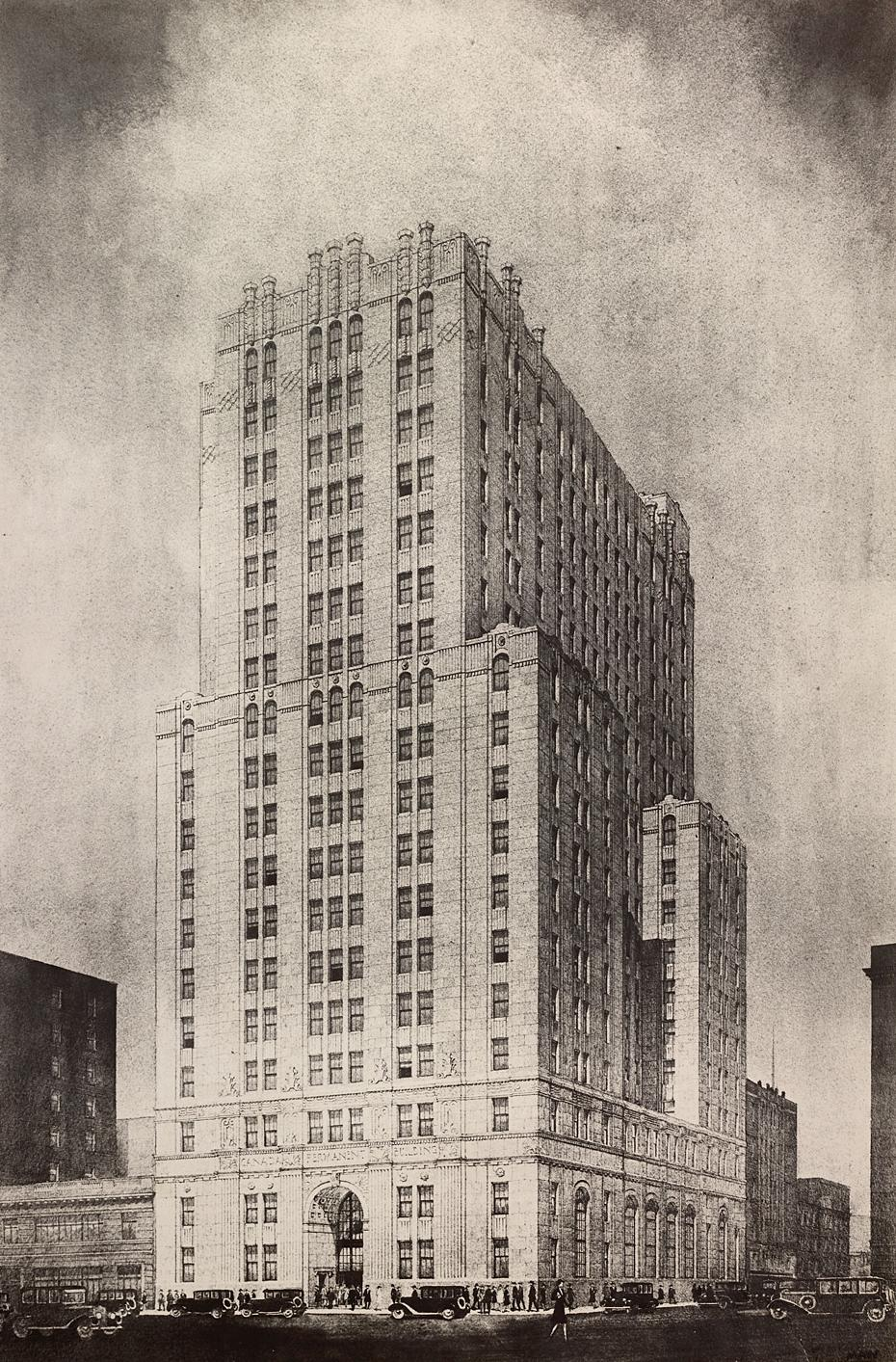
Canada Permanent (Toronto)

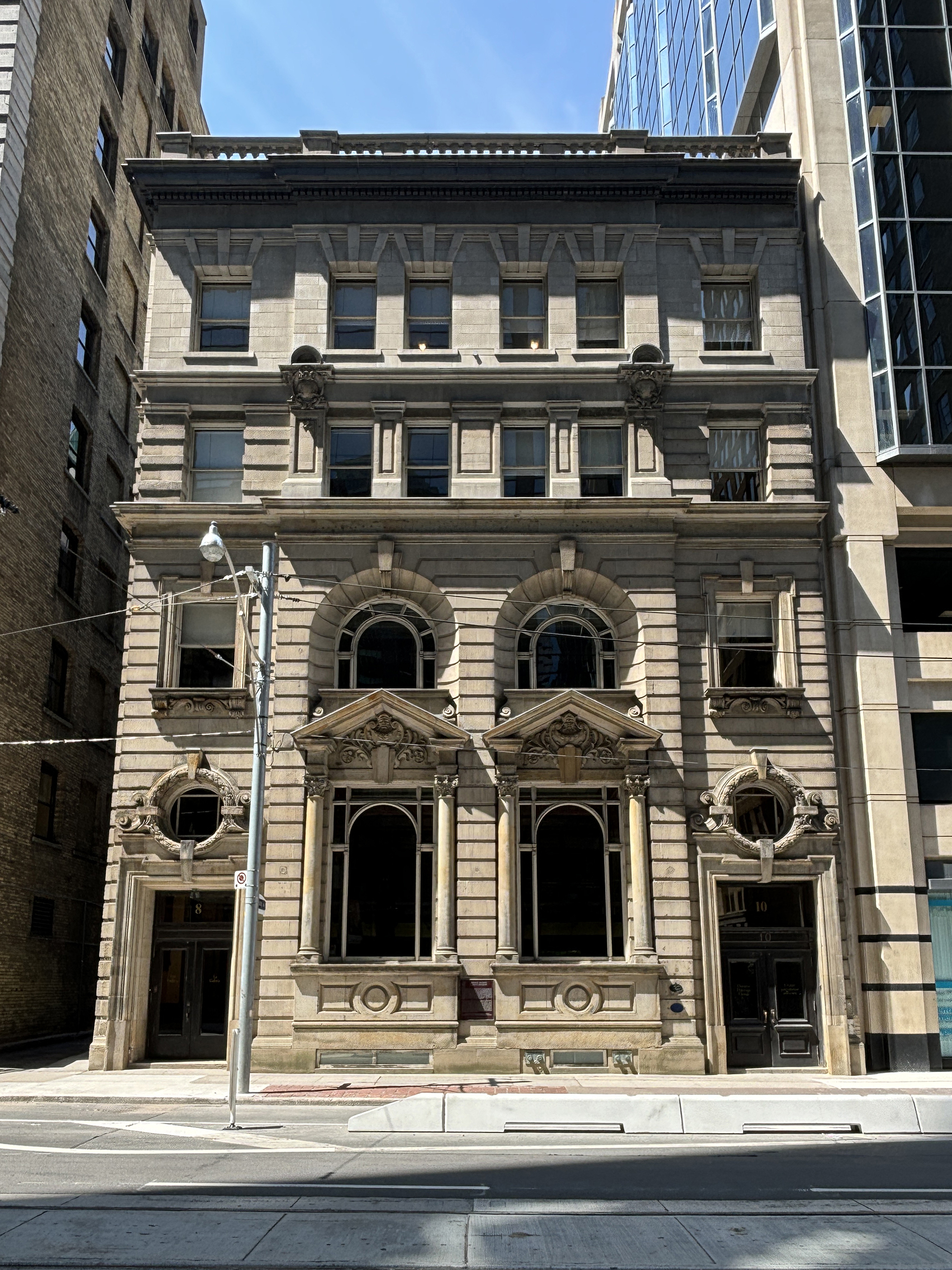
Canadian Birkbeck (Toronto)

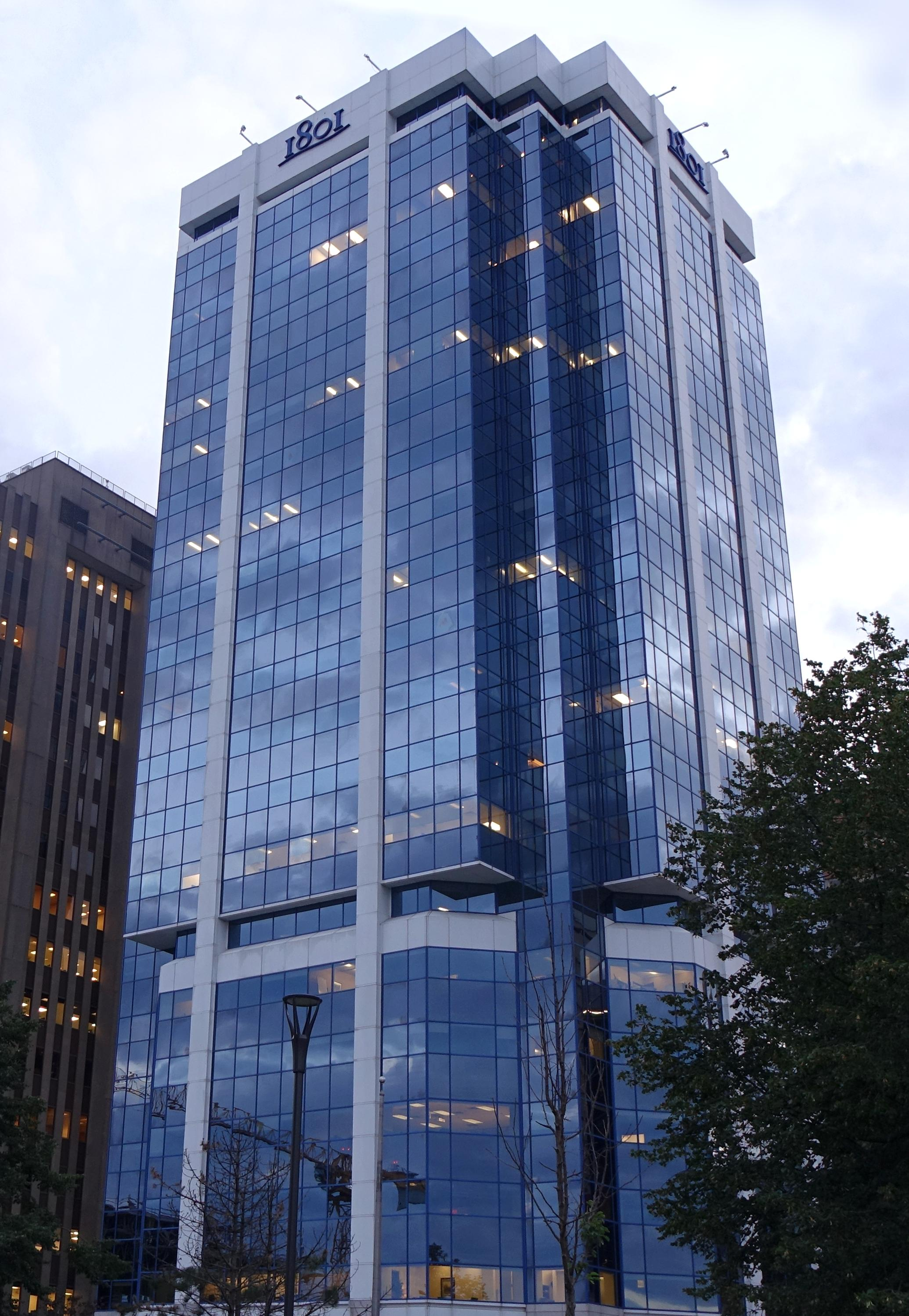
Central Trust (Halifax)

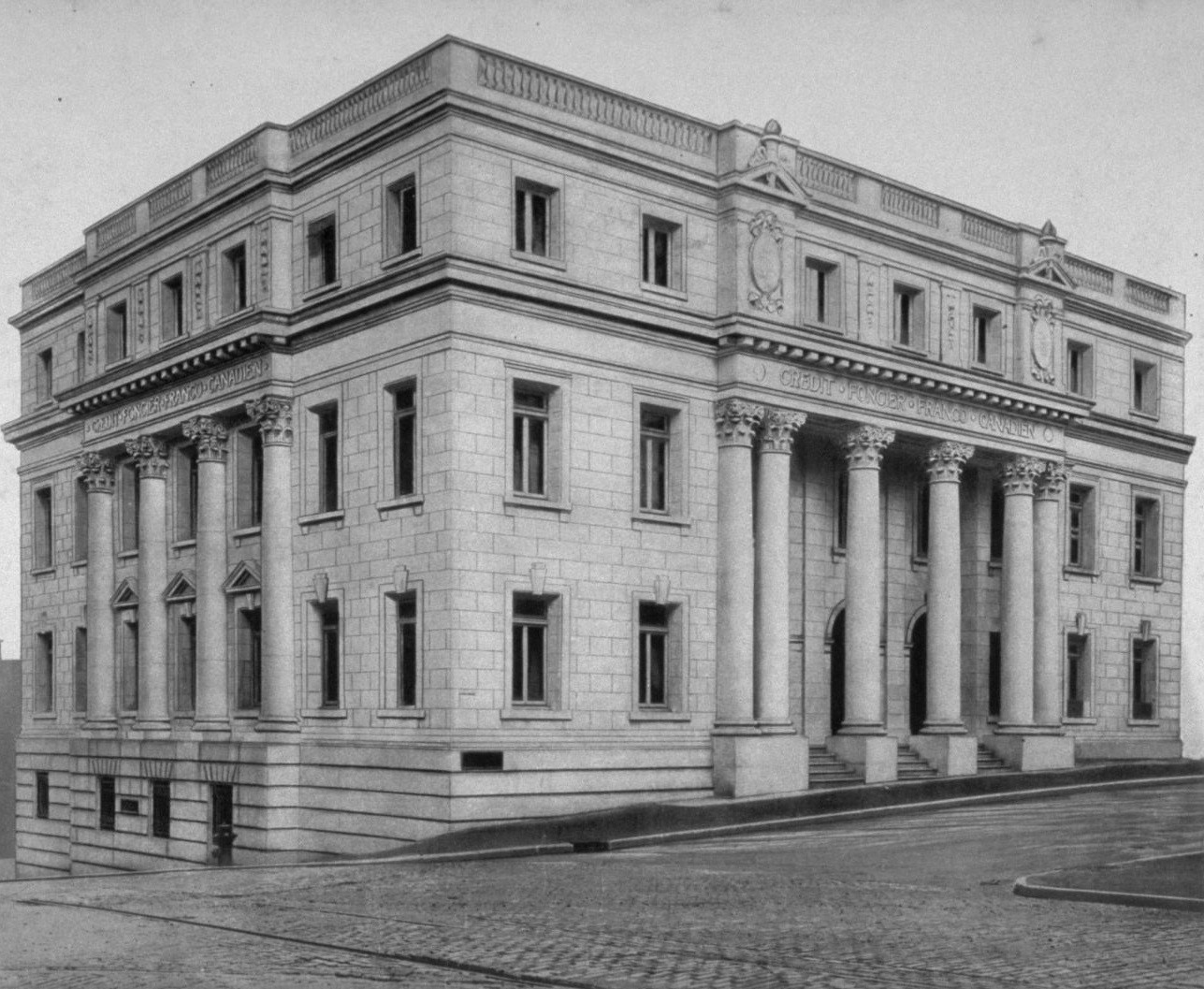
Crédit foncier (Montreal)

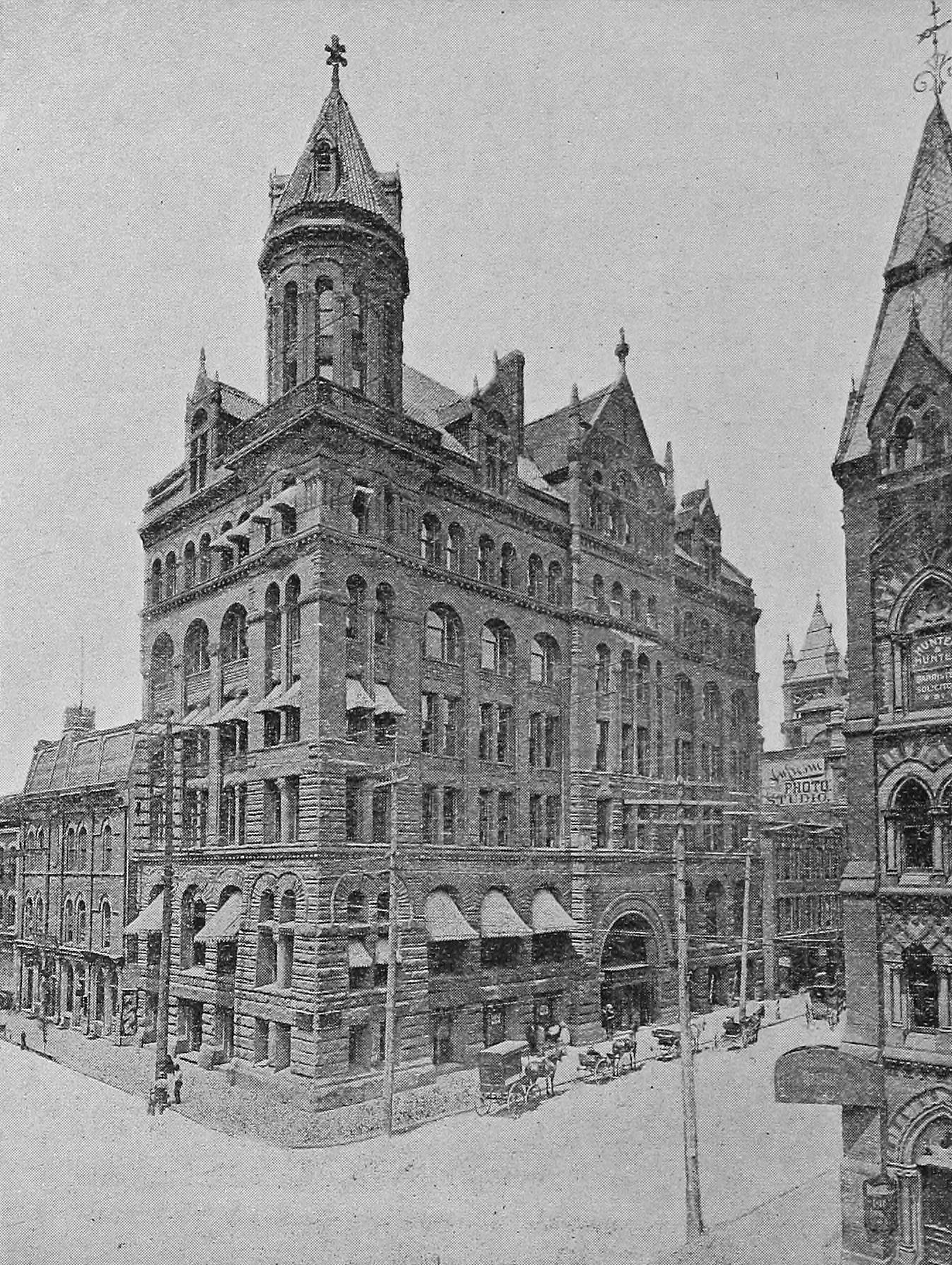
Freehold Loan (Toronto)

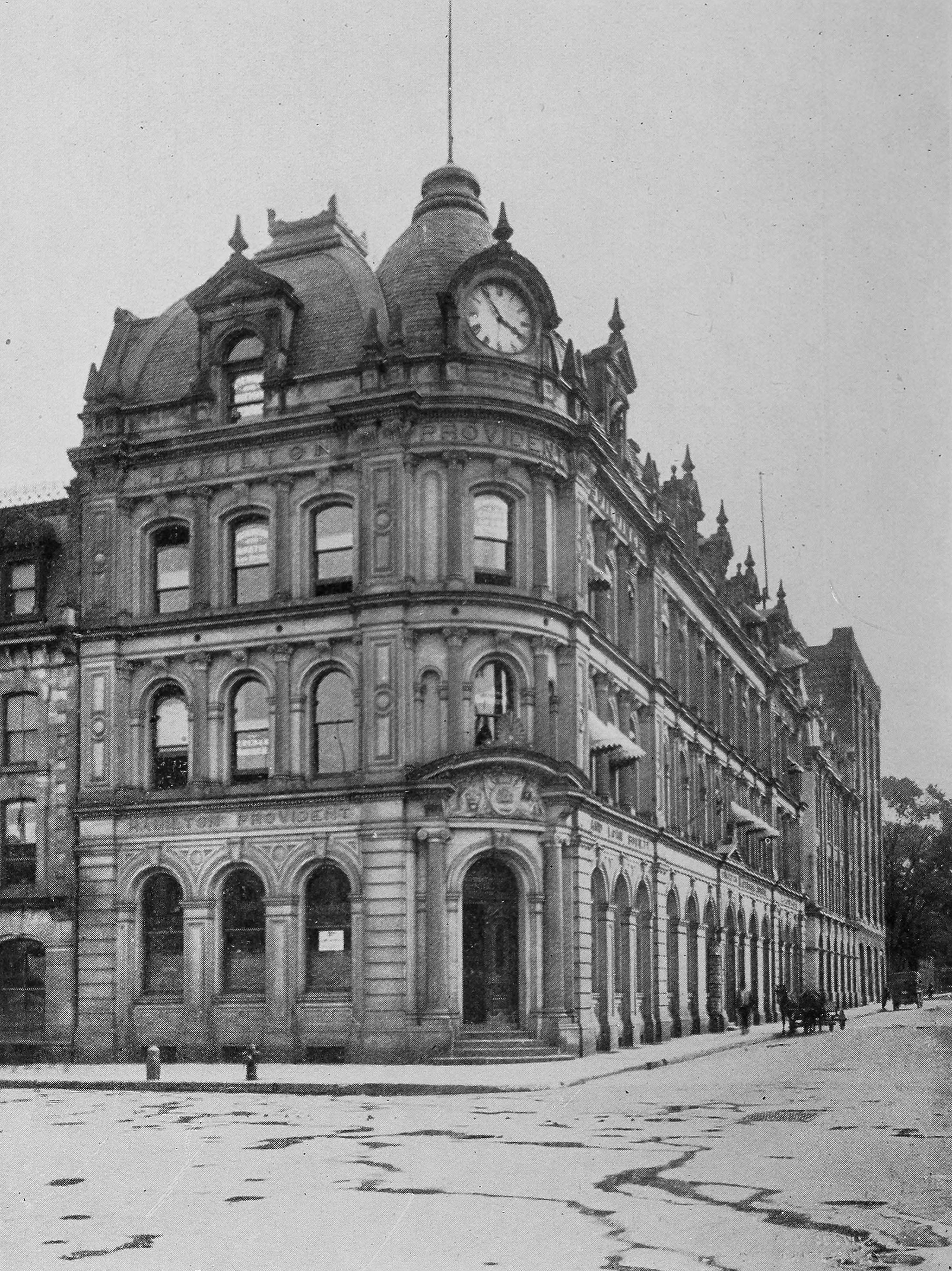
Hamilton Provident (Hamilton)

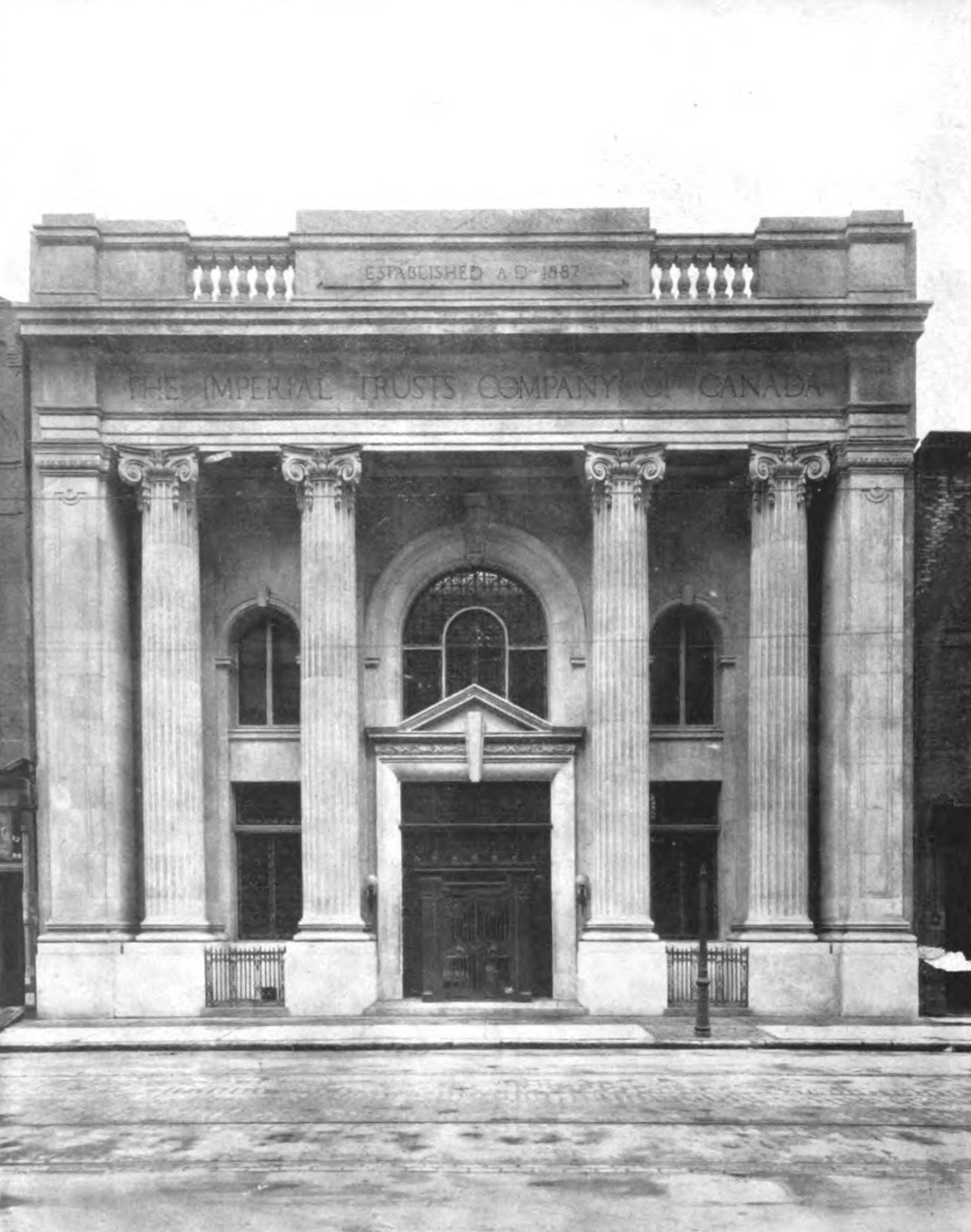
Imperial Trusts (Toronto)

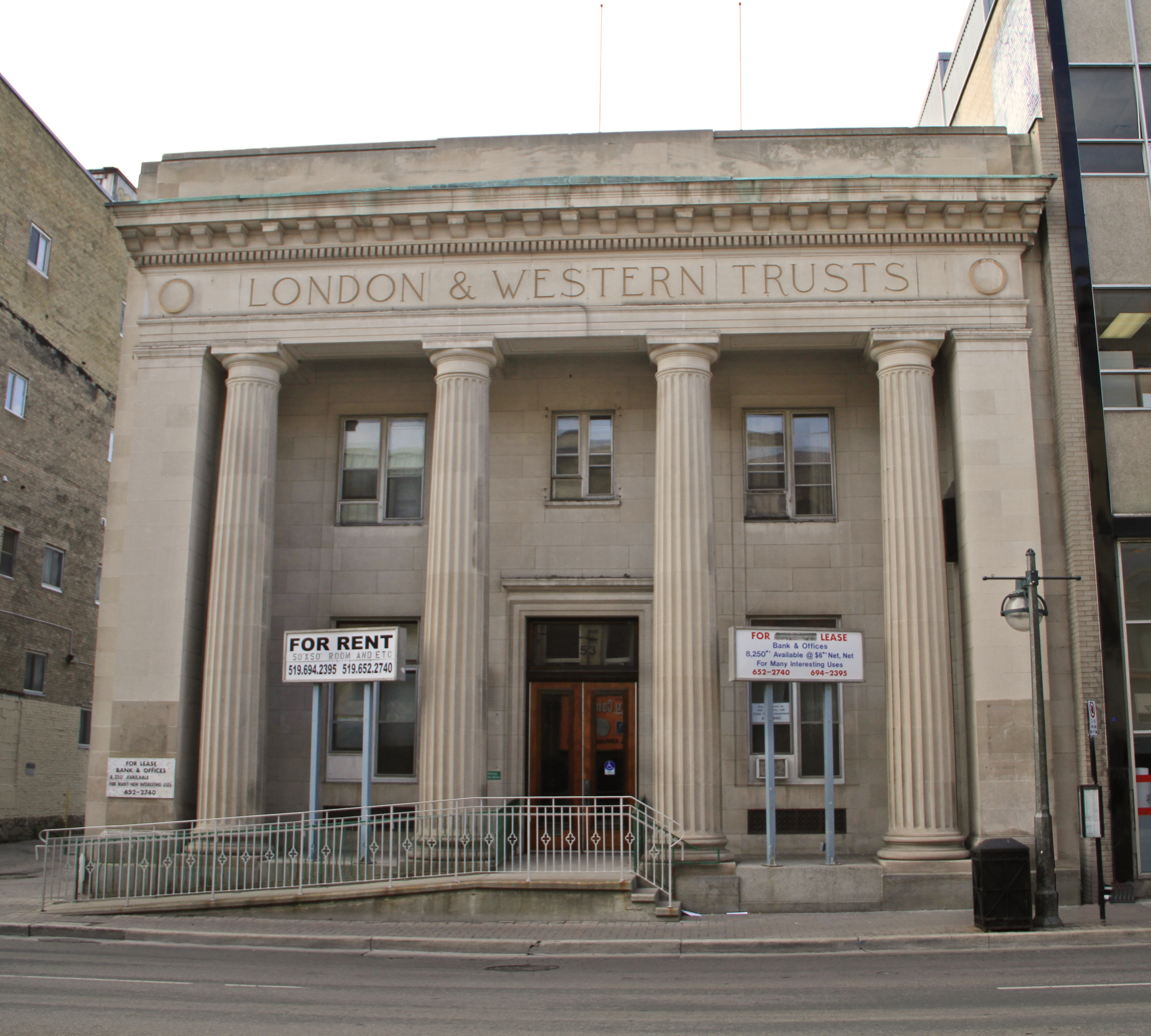
London & Western Trusts (London)

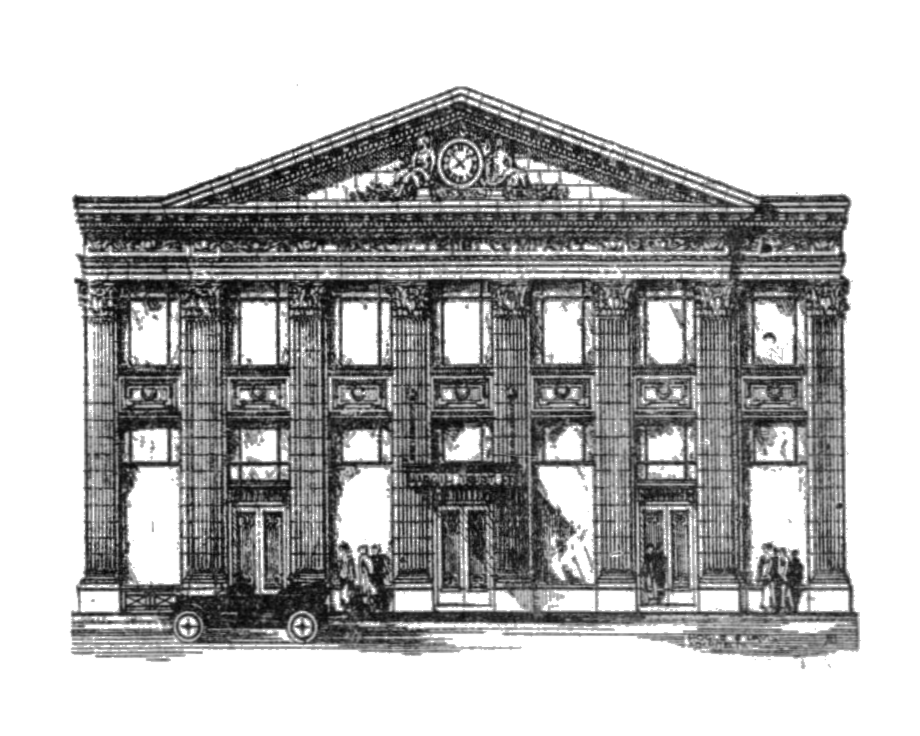
Marcil Trust (Montreal)

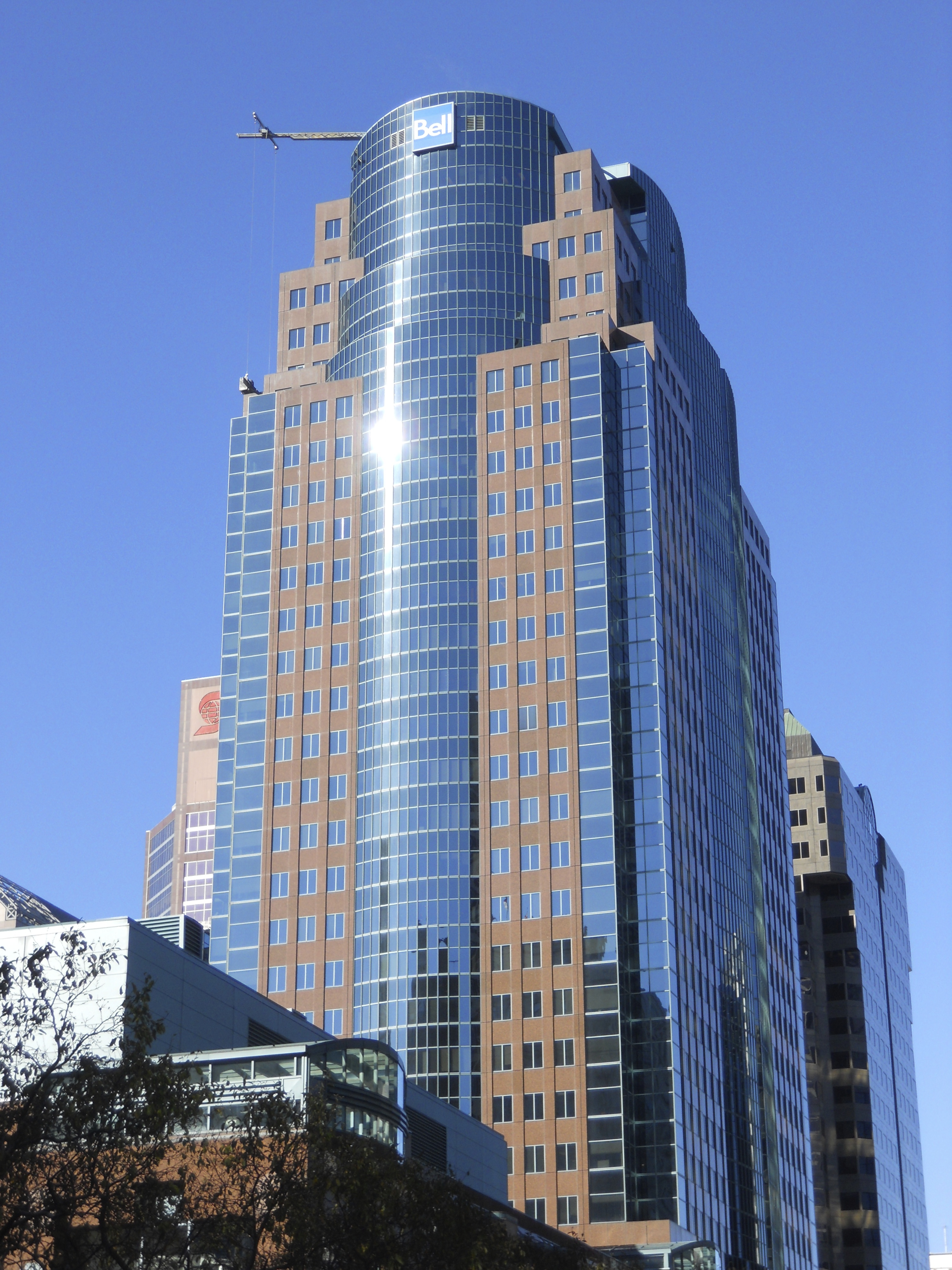
Montreal Trust (Montreal)

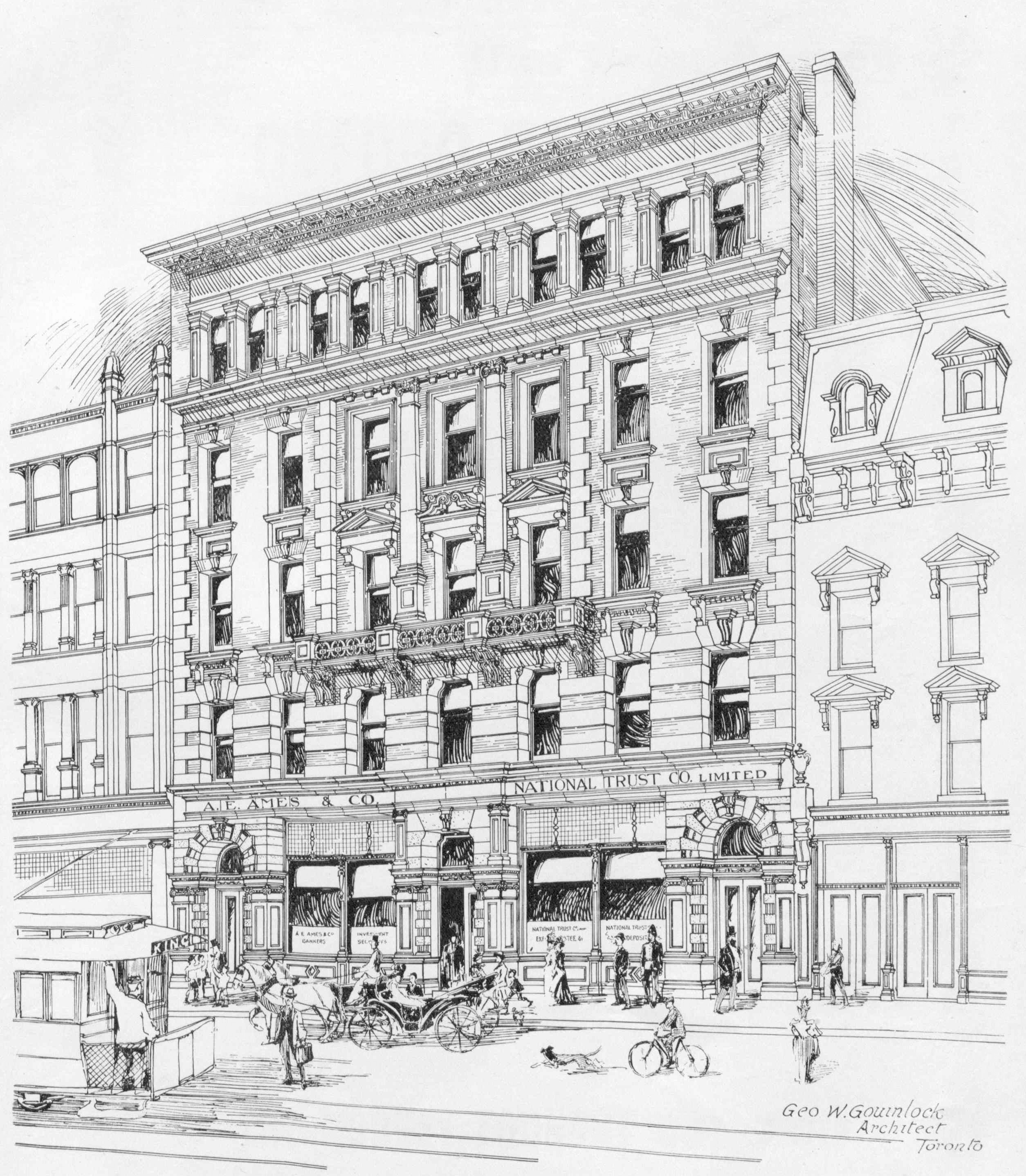
National Trust (Toronto)

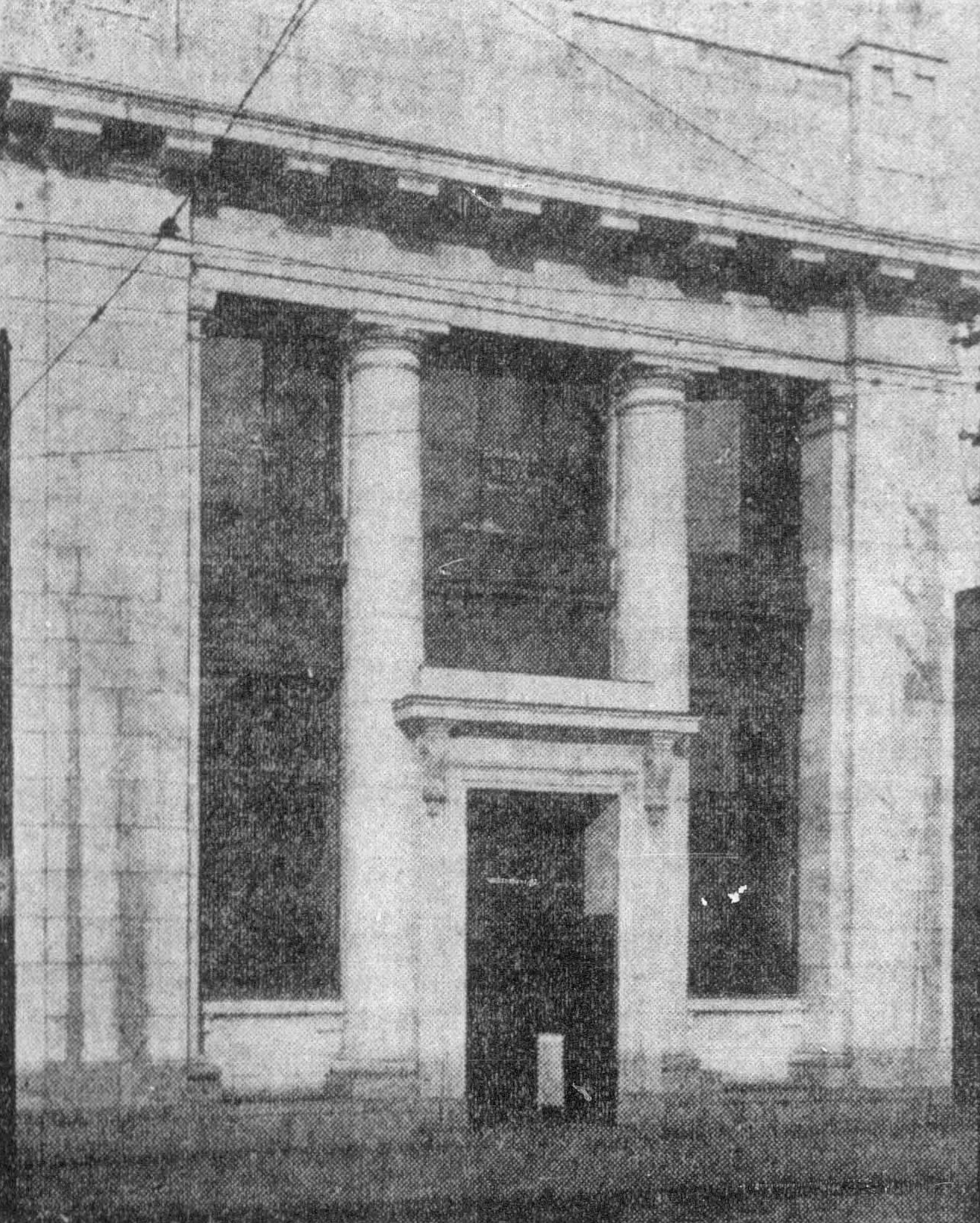
Royal Loan (Brantford)

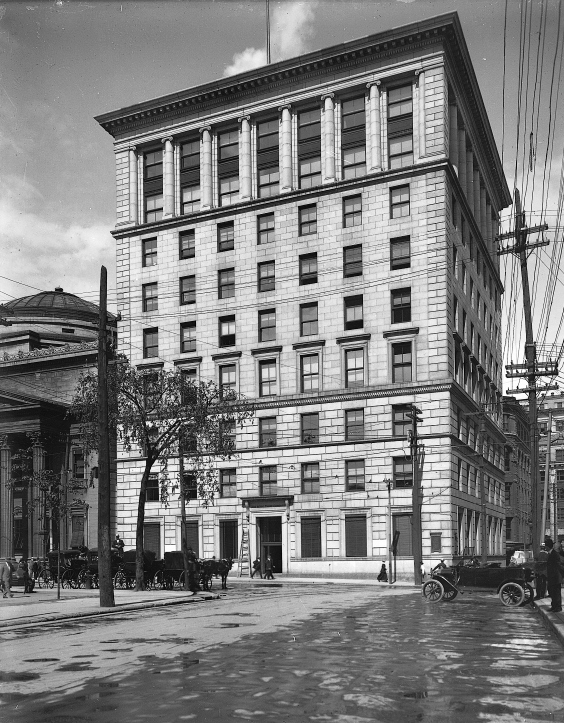
Royal Trust (Montreal)

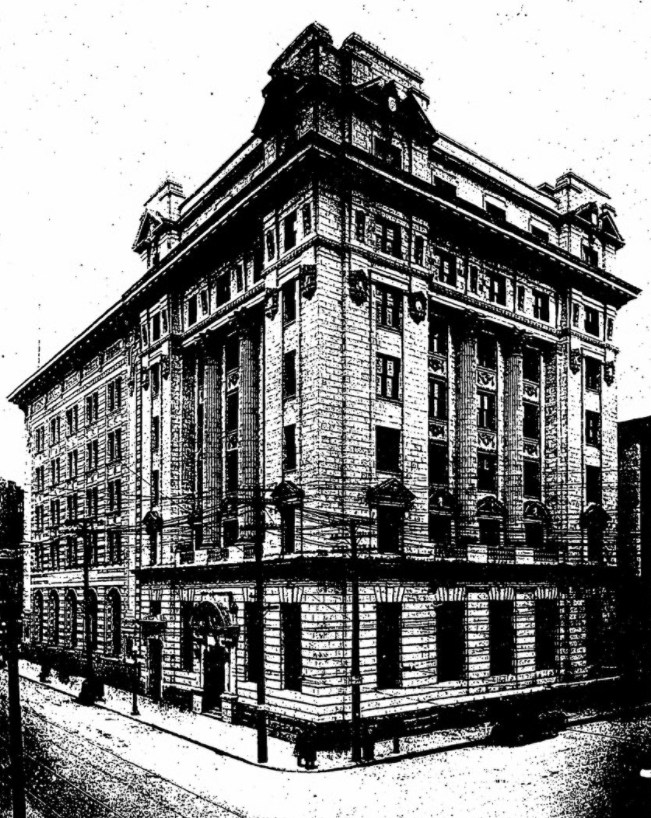
Toronto General Trusts (Toronto)

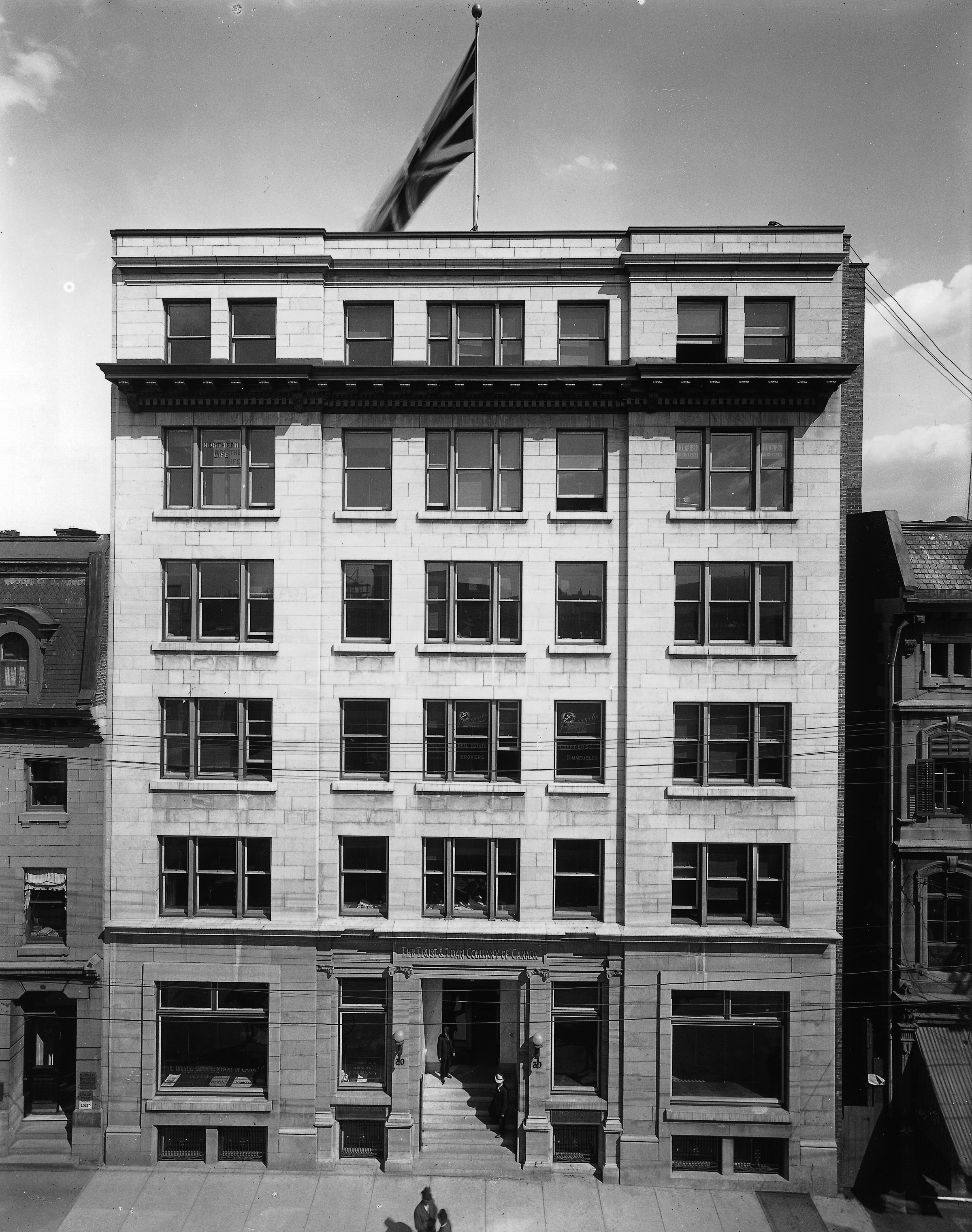
Trust & Loan Company (Montreal)

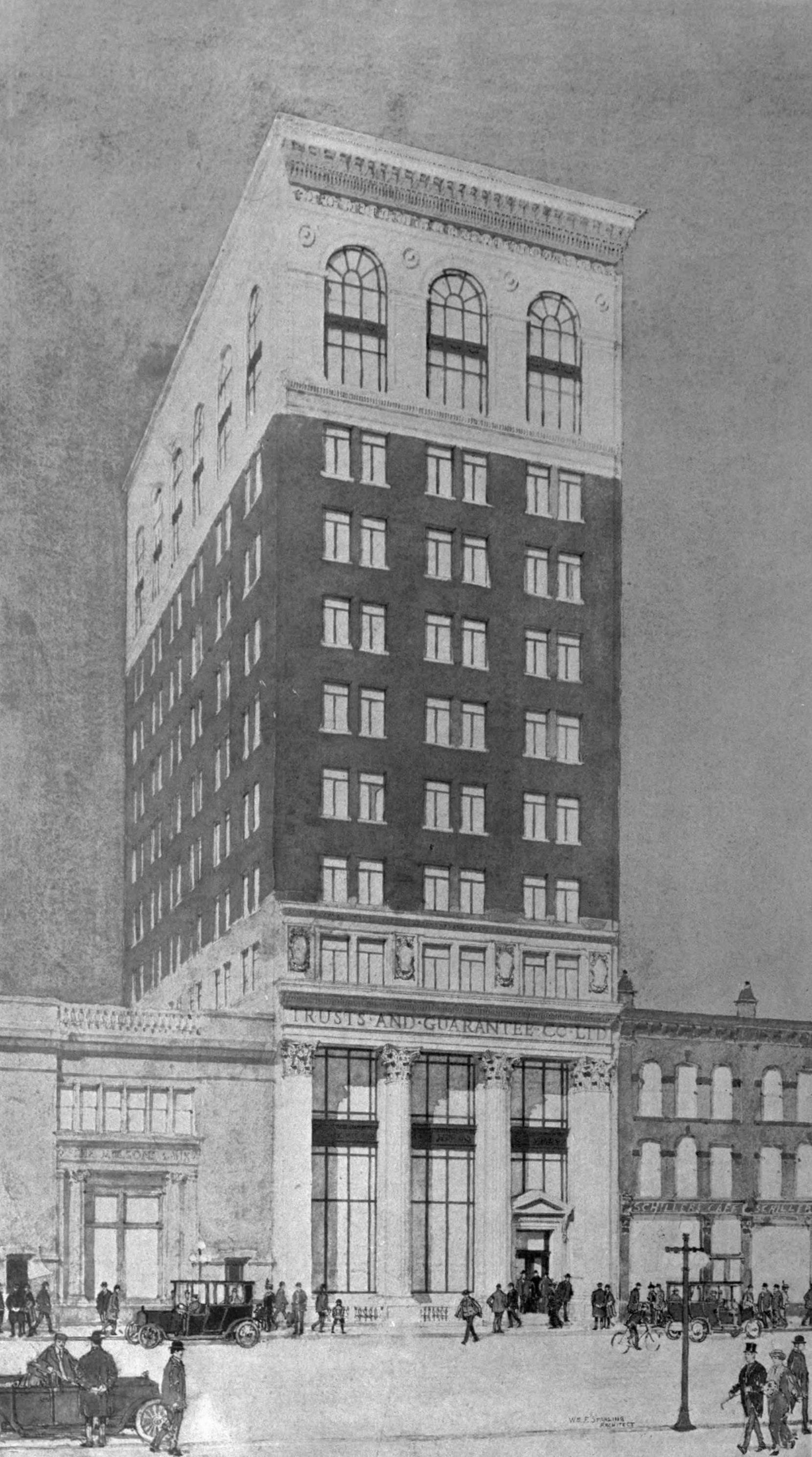
Trusts & Guarantee (Toronto)

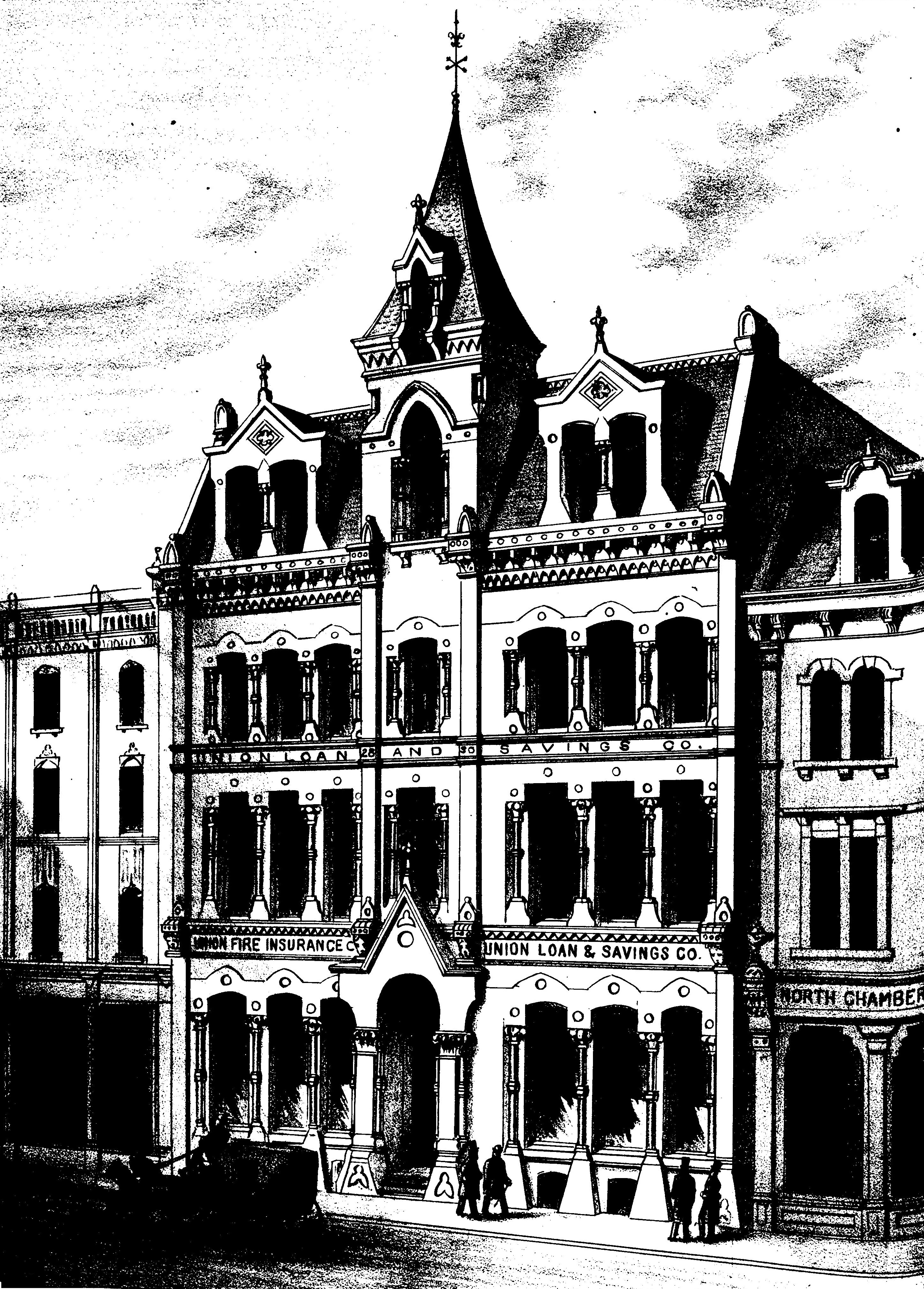
Union Loan (Toronto)

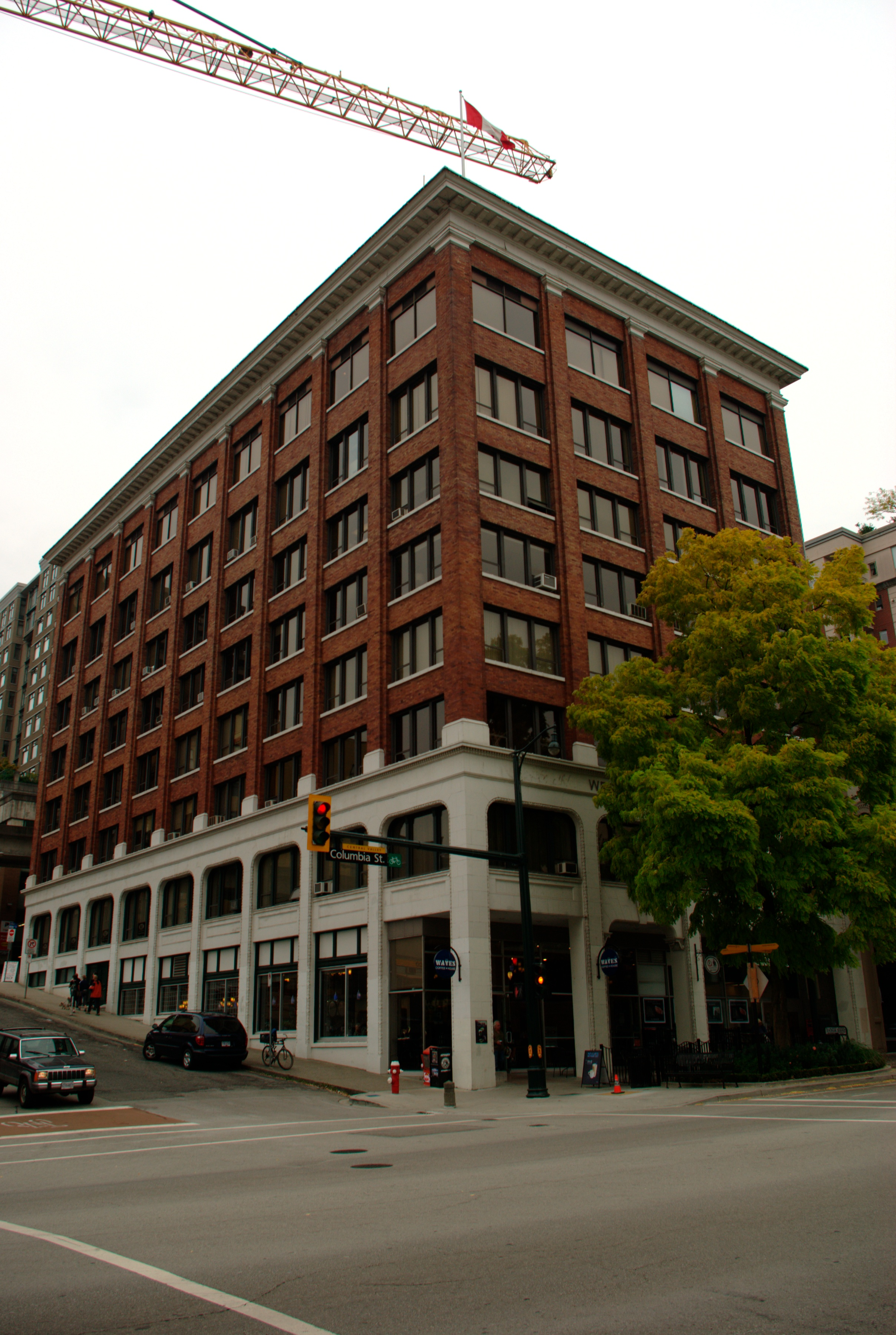
Westminster Trust (New Westminster)

== See also ==
- List of banks and credit unions in Canada
- List of insurance companies in Canada
