= Toronto General Trusts =

Canadian trust company (1872–1961)

Toronto General Trusts Corporation
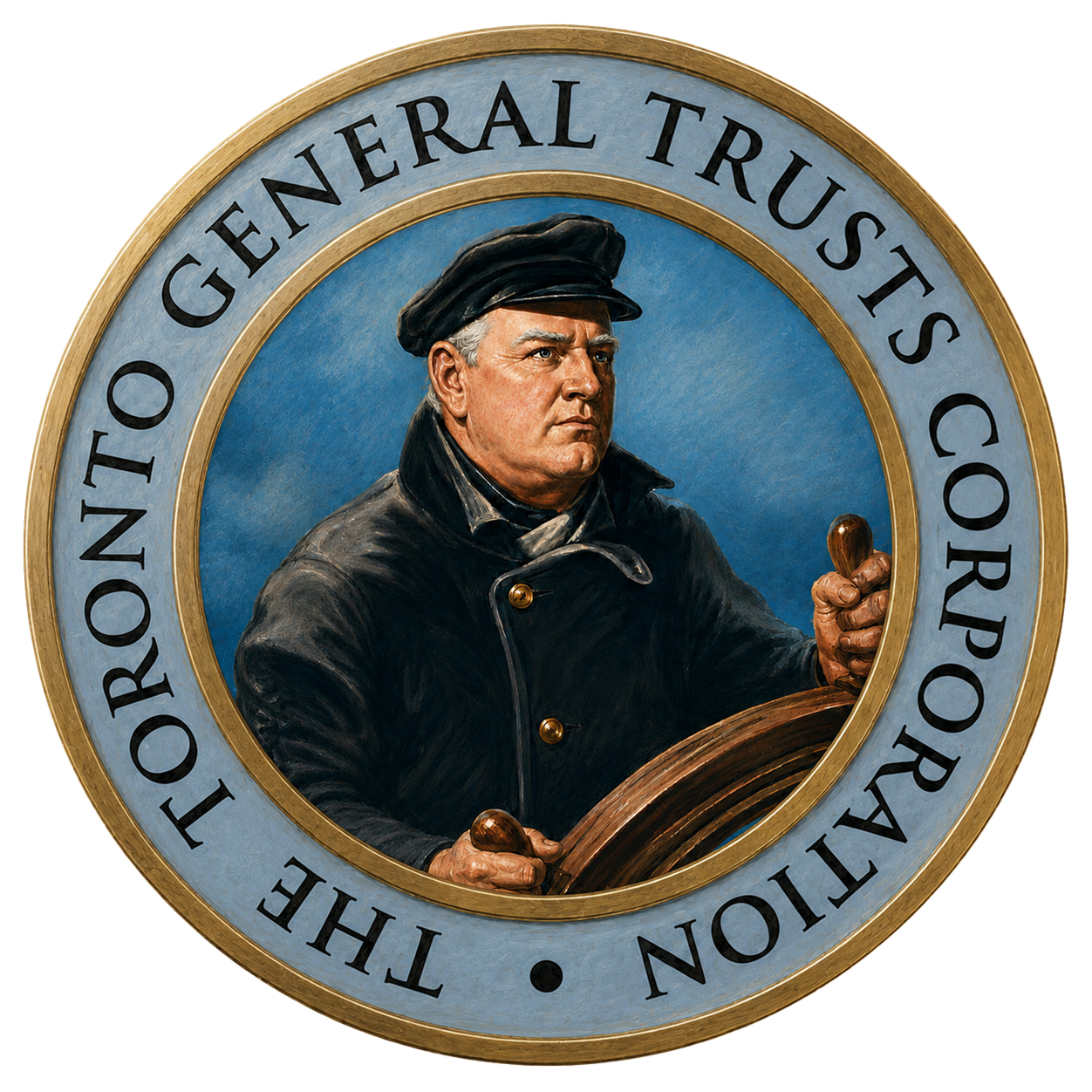
- Formerly: Toronto General Trusts Company (1872–1899)
- Industry: financial service activities, except insurance and pension funding
- Founded: 2 March 1872
- Defunct: 30 November 1961
- Fate: Merged with Canada Permanent Trust
- Headquarters: 253 Bay Street, Toronto, Ontario

The Toronto General Trusts Corporation was a Canadian trust company that existed from 1872 to 1961. The country's first trust company, the TGT received its charter in 1872, but did not begin operations until 1882. Founded as the Toronto General Trusts Company, in 1899 it took over the Trust Corporation of Ontario, at which time it changed its name to the Toronto General Trusts Corporation. By the 1950s, Toronto General was Canada's fourth largest trust company after Royal Trust, Montreal Trust, and National Trust.

In 1961, the Toronto-Dominion Bank acquired a controlling interest in Toronto General. Toronto-Dominion proceeded to merge TGT with Canada Permanent Trust. The new merged company operated as the Canada Permanent Toronto General Trust Company until 1963, when it reverted to the Canada Permanent Trust name. In 1985 Canada Permanent merged into Canada Trust, which in 2000 became a subsidiary of the Toronto-Dominion Bank.

== History ==
=== Incorporation and dormancy, 1872–1881 ===
The idea to form Canada's first trust company came from Sir William Mortimer Clark (1836–1915), a Scottish-born lawyer. In late 1871, Clark filed a petition to incorporate his company. The bill to incorporate the General Trust Co. of Ontario received its first reading in the Legislative Assembly of Ontario on 20 December 1871. The bill received its second reading on 26 January 1872, by which time the company's name had changed to the General Trusts Company of Ontario. Finally, the name was amended to the Toronto General Trusts Company on 13 February. The bill received royal assent on 2 March, thus bringing into existence Canada's first trust company. The founding shareholders listed in the articles of incorporation were John Gordon, Arthur R. McMaster, John Turner, William Thomson, James Michie, John Shedden, William Mortimer Clark, John C. Fitch, James Scott, and William Maclean of Toronto; Æmilius Irving and Joseph Price of Hamilton; and George D. Ferguson of Fergus. The bill required that the company's full $200,000 capitalisation be subscribed before it were allowed to commence operations.

Also on 2 March 1872, the Legislative Assembly passed a bill that extended trust company powers to the Ontario Trust and Investment Society, which had been founded in 1869. While Toronto General Trusts is regarded commonly as the country's first trust company, Ontario Trust became a trust company the same day.

After he received the charter for the new company, Clark set to work to raise the necessary capital. However, the idea of a trust company was too novel at the time and he failed to get the required subscriptions. Thus, the company went dormant.

=== Operations, 1881–1961 ===
In 1881, John Woodburn Langmuir (1835–1915), Ontario's inspector for prisons and asylums, and Sir James Edgar (1841–1899), Speaker of the House of Commons, obtained the charter for Toronto General Trusts from Clark. The two men raised the necessary capital to begin operations and hired the Hon. Edward Blake (1833–1912) to be the company's first president. Toronto General Trusts began operations on 10 March 1882 with Langmuir as its general manager. Its first offices were in the Royal Canadian Bank Building at 27-29 Wellington Street.

At the year ending 31 March 1883, Toronto General held $66,667.87 in assets, and paid a seven per cent dividend to its shareholders. At the year end of 31 March 1892, the company's assets crossed the million dollar threshold for the first time, with total assets under control totaling $1,190,928.43. In that year's annual report, Langmuir and Blake reported,

there is no feature in the ten years' operations which your directors regard with more satisfaction than the steady and rapid growth of the company's transactions as executor, administrator, trustee, and agent. The business which may be done by the company in these capacities is capable of great extension; and while the directors regard its growth as particularly gratifying, they believe that that growth will be continuous, since the public is daily becoming more and more convinced of the greatly increased safety and efficiency attainable by the employment of such a company as ours.

In 1889, the company purchased a building from the Canadian Bank of Commerce at the southeast corner of Yonge Street and Colborne Street for $65,000. The company spent $40,000 on renovations and aimed to move in January 1890, but construction was delayed and the move did not happen until May. In 1899 the Toronto General Trusts Company merged with the Trusts Corporation of Ontario. After the merger, the company changed its name to the Toronto General Trusts Corporation. In hopes of expanding its operations to the rapidly-developing west, in 1901 the company's new president John Hoskin (1836–1921) negotiated the purchase of the Winnipeg General Trusts Company. In Winnipeg, Toronto General Trusts took offices in a building constructed by the Bank of Hamilton that had never been occupied. Its acquisitions spree continued when in 1903 it acquired the Ottawa Trust and Deposit Company. Upon the purchase, Toronto General set up its Ottawa offices in the Scottish Ontario Chambers.

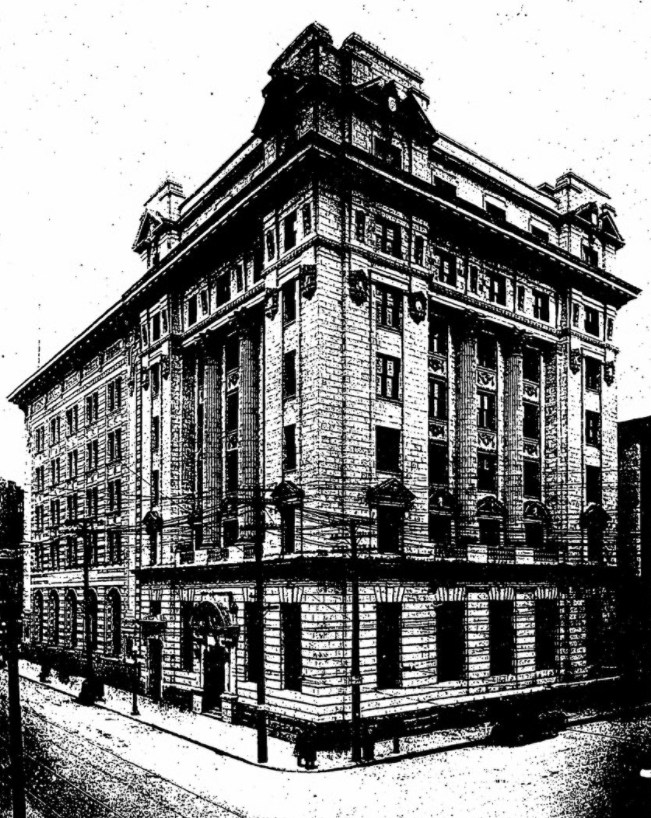
The company's headquarters at 253 Bay Street opened in April 1912 and was designed by George Martell Miller. It was demolished in 1969.

In 1909 the company built a new head office at the corner of Bay Street and Melinda Street, a seven-storey building that was designed by George Martell Miller (1854–1933). Construction began in late 1910, and the building was completed in April 1912. At the company's annual meeting on 7 February 1912, shareholders were given a preview of building. The Globe reported that "the shareholders of the Toronto General Trusts Corporation had a glimpse of the magnificence of the almost completed commercial palace at Bay and Melinda streets, which will be the future home of the company when they attended the annual meeting yesterday. Although it is 30 years ago that the Toronto General Trusts Corporation was organized, five of the original nineteen directors were present at the meeting." In 1969 it was demolished to make way for the new Commerce Court.

When John Hoskin ceded the presidency in 1910 due to ill health, the company's assets amounted to $35 million, compared to $6 million in 1890. Hoskin was succeeded by the Hon. Featherston Osler (1838–1924), which continued the company's tradition of being run by elite lawyers. Osler opened new branches in Saskatoon and Calgary, both of which fell under the management of the Winnipeg branch. In 1914, aged 80, Langmuir stepped down as general manager; he died a year later. He was succeeded in the role by his son Archibald David Langmuir (1864–1924). One of Archibald Langmuir's first achievements was the opening of a new branch in Vancouver in 1915. Each branch was overseen by a local advisory board. The Vancouver board included Robert Pim Butchart of Butchart Gardens fame. During World War I, five Toronto General employees were killed overseas: L. S. Shields, C. I. Langmuir, E. R. Jarvis, H. J. Watson, and W. C. McGregor. During the war, investment from Britain slowed, while investment from the United States picked up. The suspension of construction during the war caused the company to shift its investments from mortgages to bonds and debentures.

In 1920, the company constructed a new office in Vancouver for $100,000. In 1927 it opened a new loaning branch in Edmonton, and that same year opened an office in Montreal. The Montreal branch was located on the fourth floor of 210 St James Street in the heart of the city's financial district. Following many years without an acquisition, in 1928, the company took over the Saskatchewan Mortgage and Trust Company, whose Regina head office became a branch. That same year, the Winnipeg branch moved to 283 Portage Avenue, and work began on a new building in Calgary. Concurrently, the Toronto head office was expanded along Melinda Street, and an additional floor was added. April 1929, the company opened a savings department and by the end of the first year had 2,300 accounts worth a total of $2 million. By the end of the second year, deposits doubled. In 1930, new branches opened in Windsor and at 30 Bloor Street in Toronto.

After the onset of the Great Depression, the company dealt with mounting mortgage arrears, particularly in the west. Toronto General's profits increased in the second half of the 1930s. On 26 April 1935, Thomas Bradshaw (1868–1939) was appointed president. Bradshaw also was president of North American Life and an executive director of the Bank of Canada. Bradshaw helped the company recover from the depression before his death while in office on 10 November 1939. Bradshaw was succeeded by Albert Edmund Phipps (1873–1945), the president of the Imperial Bank of Canada. During World War II, 98 men and 10 women served in the armed forces, nine of whom were killed.

In 1952 the company acquired the Ottawa Valley Trust Company, and in 1953 the Osler and Nanton Trust Company. By the middle of the 20th century, Canada's large trust companies were controlled by the major banks via interlocking directorates. The Bank of Montreal had majority control of Royal Trust, the Royal Bank had majority control of Montreal Trust, and the Bank of Nova Scotia had majority control of National Trust. The board of Toronto General Trust had, by 1960, eight directors from the Toronto-Dominion Bank and four directors from the Imperial Bank of Commerce.

One of Toronto General's largest holdings was the estate of Melville Ross Gooderham, which held a majority of the shares of Manulife.

=== Merger with Canada Permanent Trust, 1961 ===
On 5 January 1961, the Toronto-Dominion Bank, whose agent was Wood Gundy and Company Limited, offered to purchase all outstanding shares of Toronto General Trusts at $72 per, which was 44 per cent above the trading value. The offer was accepted by the board of directors. On 21 April of that year, Toronto General and the Canada Permanent Trust Company applied to merge. The merger was initiated by the Toronto-Dominion bank, which controlled Canada Permanent Trusts's parent company, the Canada Permanent Mortgage Corporation. At the time of the merger, the parent company's assets were worth $181 million. Shareholders of both companies voted to approve the merger on 27 September, and the merger became effective on 1 December. The new merged entity became the second largest trust company in Canada and had assets of $813 million, behind only National Trust, which had assets of $838 million.The new company was called the Canada Permanent Toronto General Trust Company. Two years later the company removed "Toronto General" from its name and reverted to the Canada Permanent Trust Company name.

In 1981 Canada Permanent was acquired by the Genstar Development Company. Genstar then purchased the Canada Trust Company in 1985, and merged Canada Permanent into Canada Trust. In 1986, Genstar was acquired by Imasco. In 2000, Imasco was acquired by British American Tobacco. After the purchase, British American sold Canada Trust to the Toronto-Dominion Bank, who renamed it TD Canada Trust.

== Presidents ==
1. Hon. Edward Blake, 1882–1896
2. John Hoskin, 1896–1910
3. Hon. Featherston Osler, 1910–1924
4. Sir Byron Edmund Walker, 1924
5. Hon Newton Wesley Rowell, 1925–1935
6. Thomas Bradshaw, 1935–1939
7. Albert Edmund Phipps, 1940–1943
8. Charles McCrea, 1943–1952
9. Collamer Chipman Calvin, 1952–1961

== Architecture ==
In addition to the head office in Toronto, the Toronto General Trusts Corporation constructed three other buildings across Canada. The only one of its four buildings that survives is that in Montreal. Its other buildings were:

- Vancouver – 590 West Pender Street, James Anderson Benzie, 1920 (demolished)
- Calgary – 315 8 Avenue SW, Charles Edward Langley, 1930 (demolished)
- Montreal – 350 Notre-Dame Street West, L. A. and P. C. Amos, 1947
