= Genstar =

Genstar may refer to:

- Genstar Development Company, a Canadian real estate development company
- Genstar Capital, a U.S. private equity firm
