= Canada Permanent Trust Building =

Office building in Toronto, Ontario

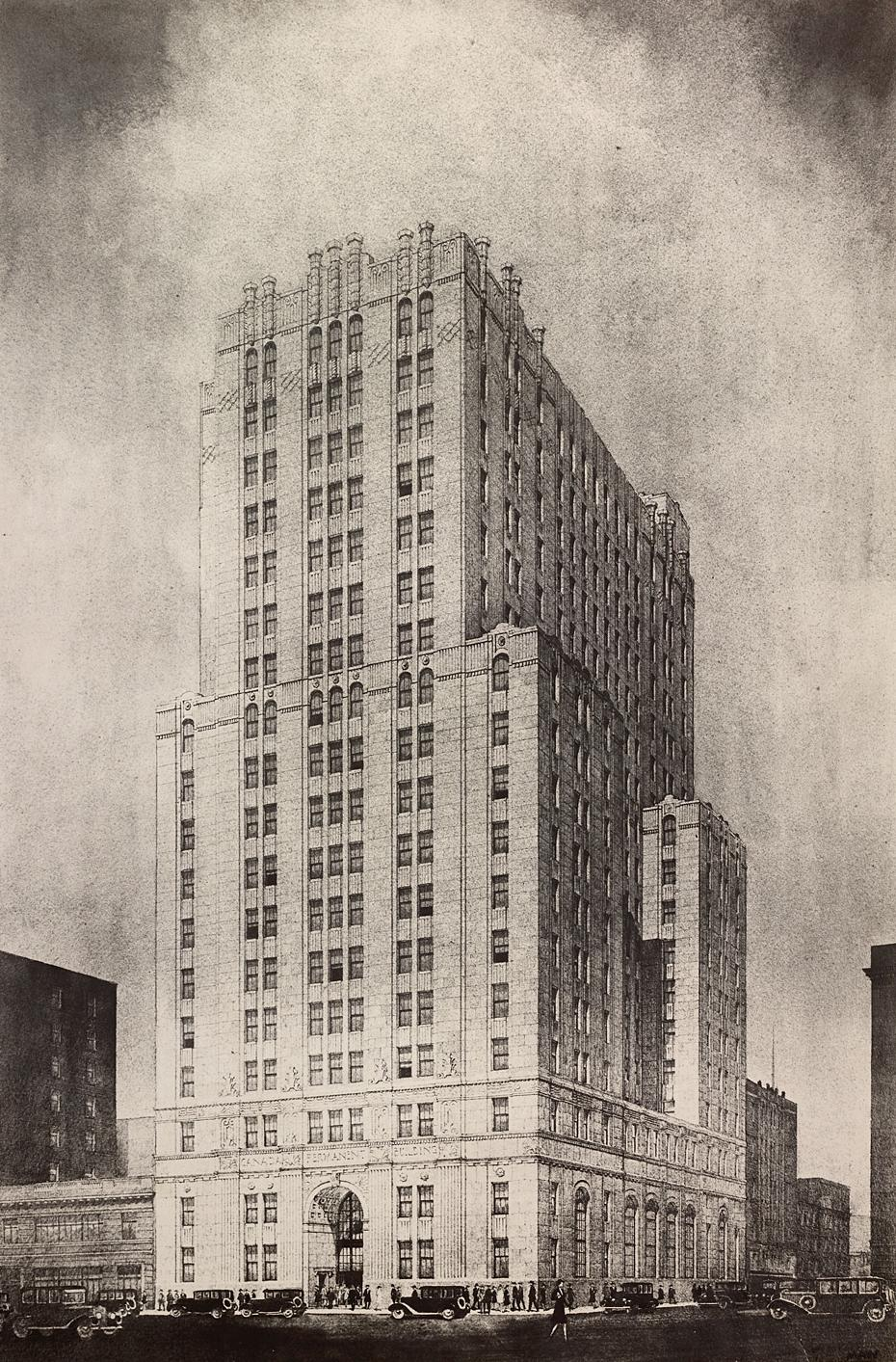
- Architectural rendering of the building
- Interactive map of Canada Permanent Trust Building
- 43.64962°N 79.38107°W
- Type: office building

History
- Built: 1928–1930

Site notes
- Architect(s): F.H. Wilkes, Mathers & Haldenby; Sproatt & Rolph
- Architectural style: Art Deco
- Owner: Menkes Developments Ltd. and TD Greystone Asset Management

Ontario Heritage Act
- Designated: Nov 26, 1975

The Canada Permanent Trust Building (now known as "The Permanent") is an 18-storey office building located at 320 Bay Street, in downtown Toronto. It was designed by the architect Henry Sproatt and completed in 1930. The building was constructed as the headquarters of Canada Permanent.

== History ==
The building was opened on the 75th anniversary of the Canada Permanent Mortgage Corporation, March 1, 1930. The company had moved from another building in Toronto into the "more modern and commodious headquarters", which stood 18 1/2 stories high along Bay Street.

== Heritage information ==
The building is designated under Part IV of the Ontario Heritage Act since November 26, 1975. There is also a heritage easement agreement on the building, Registered C440805, since January 7, 1988. The building has a heritage designation plaque to inform the public, placed in 1978.

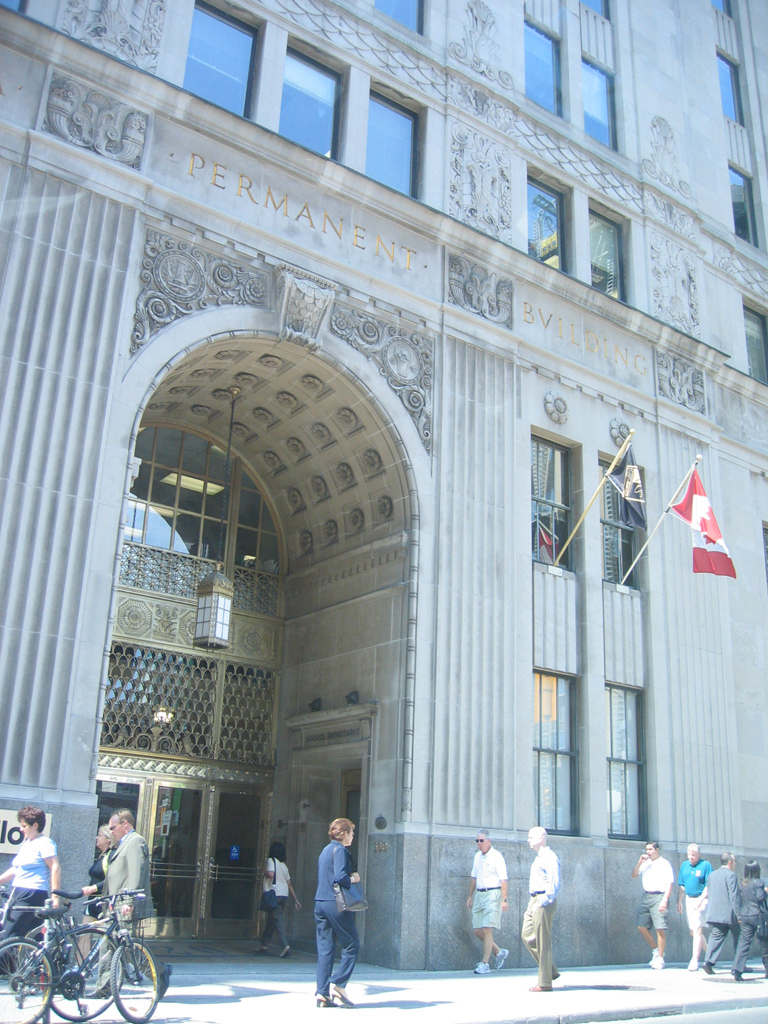
Canada Permanent Trust Building in 2006

Per the official designation: "The Canada Permanent Trust Building, 320 Bay Street at Adelaide Street West (SW), 1929–30 by F. Hilton Wilkes & Mackenzie Waters; Mathers & Haldenby, Associates. Sproatt & Rolph, Consultants."

The Canada Permanent Trust Building is designated to be of architectural value as being one of the finest high-rise bank buildings of its period in Canada. Designed using the simplified classical forms of the Style Moderne, it combines an emphasis on its vertical height appropriate to its basic form, with the impressive vaulted banking hall, characteristic of bank buildings at the beginning of the Century. The building is also important as a part of the Bay Street canyon of high-rise buildings that has come to be regarded as symbolic of Toronto's financial quarter."

== Ownership and renovation ==
The Canada Permanent Trust building was purchased in January 2019 by Menkes Developments Ltd. and TD Greystone Asset Management. It is now known as "The Permanent". A major restoration of the 270,000 square foot structure began in 2021. This includes repurposing of the street level of the building, electrical and mechanical upgrades, as well as improving "the quality and service of the space, while preserving its history and architectural elements" including enhancements to the late 1920s façade.
