= Canada Trust =

Canadian trust company

Canada Trust Company
- Formerly: General Trust Corporation of Canada (1894–1899)
- Industry: Financial services
- Founded: 23 July 1894
- Owner: Toronto-Dominion Bank (2000–present)

The Canada Trust Company is a Canadian trust company that has existed since 1894. The company was founded in Calgary as the General Trust Corporation of Canada. In 1899, it was acquired by the Huron and Erie Savings and Loan Society, which moved it to London, Ontario and changed its name to the Canada Trust Company.

In September 1985, Canada Trust was acquired by the conglomerate Genstar and, at the beginning of 1986, Genstar merged Canada Trust with Canada Permanent, continuing under the Canada Trust name. The merged company, which became the country's sixth-largest financial institution, was acquired in March 1986 by the tobacco conglomerate Imasco.

In June 1999, Imasco's controlling shareholder, British American Tobacco, announced its plan to increase its share in Imasco to a majority. As part of the deal, British American would sell Canada Trust to the Toronto-Dominion Bank. The sale, worth C$7.8 billion, closed on 1 February 2000. The Canada Trust Company remains an operating company of Toronto-Dominion through the bank's TD Mortgage Corporation subsidiary.

== History ==
=== Founding in Calgary, 1894–1899 ===
The articles of incorporation of the General Trust Corporation of Canada received royal assent on 23 July 1894. The founding shareholders were James Alexander Lougheed, Harry Symons, William Roper Hull, John Lineham, Alfred B. Few, George Kidd Leeson, Henry W. C. Meyer, Harry William Nanton, and Edmund Cave. Lougheed served as its first president. Historian Philip Smith wrote that, "having procured their charter, those early westerners do not seem to have done much with it, since references to it through the years in the Huron & Erie's records describe it as 'largely inactive."

=== Takeover by Huron & Erie, 1899–1901 ===
In 1899, seven officers of the Huron and Erie Savings and Loan Society of London, Ontario paid a combined $115,000 to acquire the General Trust Corporation of Canada. After the purchase, the group transferred their shares to Huron and Erie, moved General Trust's offices to London, and renamed the business the Canada Trust Company. Canada Trust opened for business in 1901 with Verschoyle Cronyn as its new president, and George Somerville as its managing director.

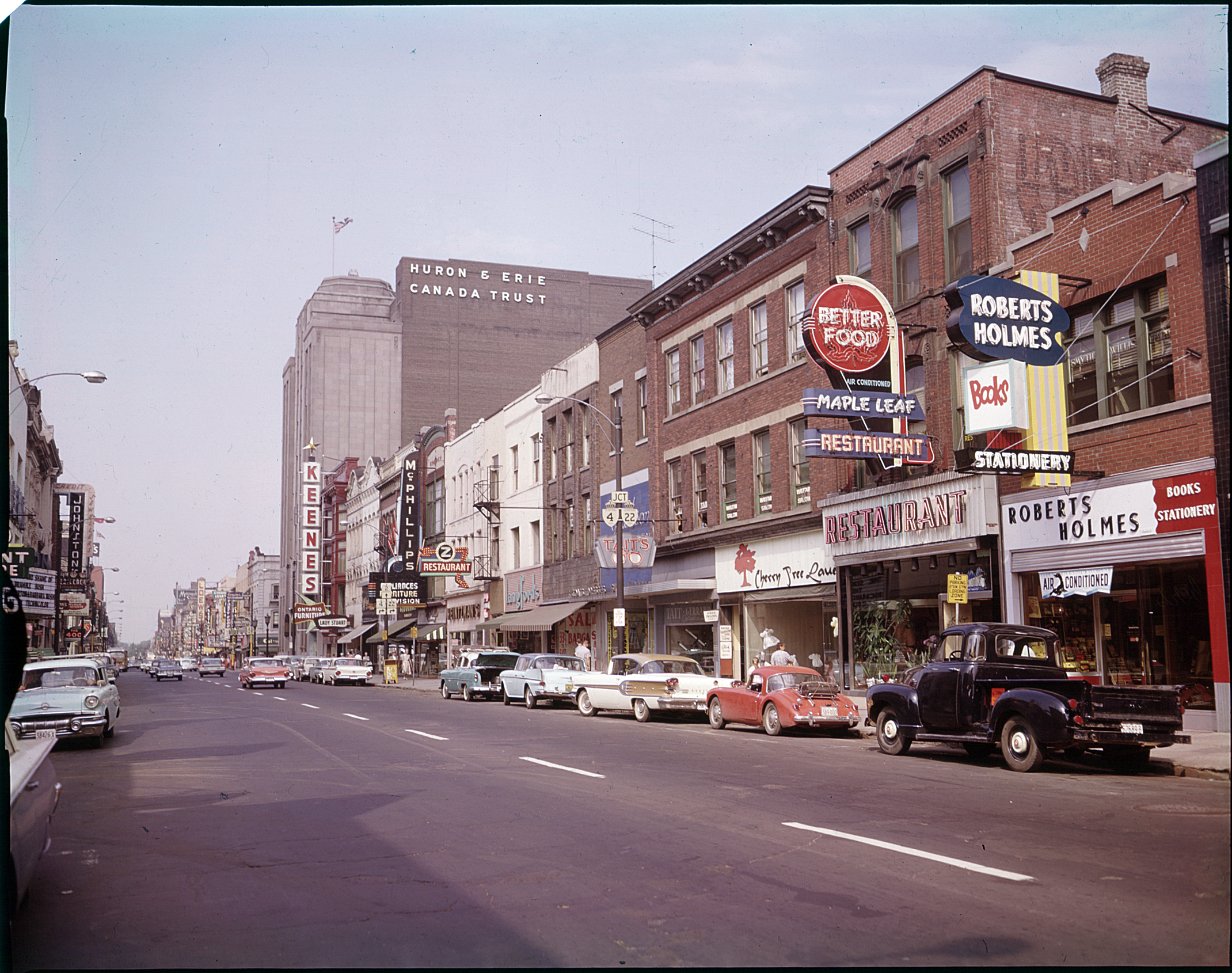
The Huron and Erie–Canada Trust headquarters in London, Ontario is visible in this 1960 photo. Today, the building houses a branch of the successor bank, TD Canada Trust, with the first transit number assigned to TD: 0001.

=== Development as a major trust, 1901–1985 ===
The parent company changed its name to the Huron and Erie Mortgage Corporation in 1915, then began branding itself as Huron and Erie–Canada Trust; the branding was changed to Canada Trust–Huron and Erie in 1962 to reflect the company's national reach. In 1976, Huron and Erie changed its name to Canada Trustco Mortgage Company and continued to operate Canada Trust as a subsidiary.

Canada Trust was a trust company that offered the same services as a bank. It was one of Canada's largest non-bank financial institutions, with $38 billion in deposits and $176 billion in assets. It had 11,000 employees and 3.5 million customers and operated a network of 413 branches across Canada; and almost 1,000 automated banking machines. Its banking machines were, at one point in the late 1980s to early 1990s, called "Johnnycash" machines. They were even promoted with lifesize cutouts of Johnny Cash asking the question, "Why walk the line?", a reference to one of his hit songs.

In the United States, CT Financial operated through First Federal Savings and Loan Association. First Federal was founded in 1896, and operated through 82 branches throughout New York State. CT Financial also operated other divisions including Truscan Realty Limited (doing business as Canada Trust Realty), CT Insurance Limited, and Canada Trust Bank N.V.

=== Genstar, Imasco ownership, 1985–2000 ===
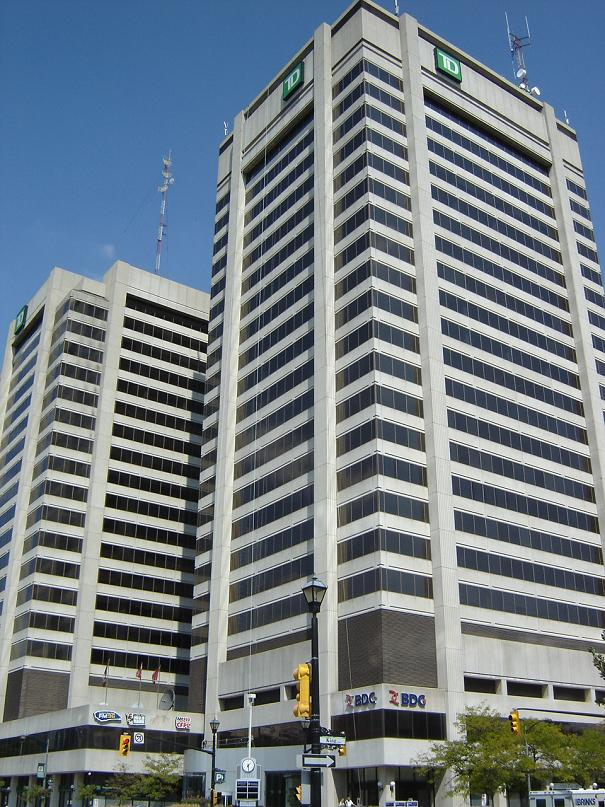
The Canada Trust was headquartered in the City Centre Towers from 1974 to 2000.

In September 1985, Genstar Corporation of Vancouver, run by Angus MacNaughton, purchased Canada Trust. In 1981, Genstar had purchased the Canada Permanent Mortgage Corporation, which included Permanent's subsidiary the Canada Permanent Trust Company. Effective 1 January 1986, Genstar merged Canada Trust with Canada Permanent. After the merger, Canada Trust's assets increased from $13.5 billion to $21 billion, and its number of branches increased from 208 to 320. Additionally, the new Canada Trust held more savings deposits than both the Toronto-Dominion Bank and the Bank of Nova Scotia.

Shortly after the Canada Trust–Canada Permanent merger, on 24 March 1986, the Montreal-based tobacco company Imasco made a USD 1.43 billion offer to take Genstar over. The offer received considerable criticism, and in April the cross-party finance committee of the House of Commons voted unanimously to block the takeover. The president of the Canadian Bankers' Association, Robert MacIntosh, called also for the takeover to be blocked. On 17 April, Secretary of State Barbara McDougall announced that the takeover had been approved. By late May, Imasco had acquired around 95 per cent of Genstar shares. To help pay the debts incurred in the takeover, Imasco issued seven million shares of its own.

In September 1987, Imasco formed a new holding company for Canada Trustco Mortgage, called CT Financial Services Inc.

=== Acquisition by Toronto-Dominion, 1999–2000 ===
In 1999, Imasco was controlled by British American Tobacco, which owned 42 per cent of the company's shares. In June of that year, British American announced a plan to increase its share to 58 per cent. As part of the purchase, British American would dispose of Imasco's three non-tobacco businesses: CT Financial Services, Shoppers Drug Mart, and Genstar Development. In August, British American announced it had struck a tentative deal with the Toronto-Dominion Bank to acquire CT Financial. In January 2000, Toronto-Dominion shareholders voted to approve the acquisition, which would see TD pay $67 per share for Imasco's 98.2 per cent of CT, worth CAD 7.8 billion. On 1 February 2000, finance minister Paul Martin approved the purchase, on the condition that Toronto-Dominion sell off CT's MasterCard business.

After the takeover, Canada Trust's retail banking operations were integrated into TD's similar operations, now collectively known as TD Canada Trust. This new subsidiary now primarily provides traditional trust company services, and also services Canada Trust accounts opened prior to the merger with TD (other existing TD Canada Trust-branded accounts are actually issued by TD Bank itself).

== Leadership ==
=== President ===
1. Sir James Alexander Lougheed, 1899–1900
2. Verschoyle Cronyn, 1900–1907
3. Thomas Graves Meredith, 1907–1926
4. Maj. Hume Blake Cronyn, 1926–1933
5. Thomas Graves Meredith, 1933–1943
6. Morley Aylsworth, 1943–1958
7. John Allyn Taylor, 1958–1973
8. Arthur Hammond Mingay, 1973–1978
9. Mervyn Lloyd Lahn, 1978–1987
10. John Herbert Speake, 1987–1989
11. Peter Charles Maurice, 1989–1993
12. William Edmund Clark, 1994–2000

=== Chairman of the Board ===
1. Sir James Alexander Lougheed, 1899–1900
2. Thomas Graves Meredith, 1926–1943
3. Col. Elton Ibbotson Leonard, 1943–1958
4. Verschoyle Philip Cronyn, 1958–1968
5. John Allyn Taylor, 1968–1978
6. Arthur Hammond Mingay, 1978–1985
7. John Arthur Charles Hilliker, 1986
8. Mervyn Lloyd Lahn, 1987–1990
9. Harold Purdy Crawford, 1990–2000

== Gallery ==
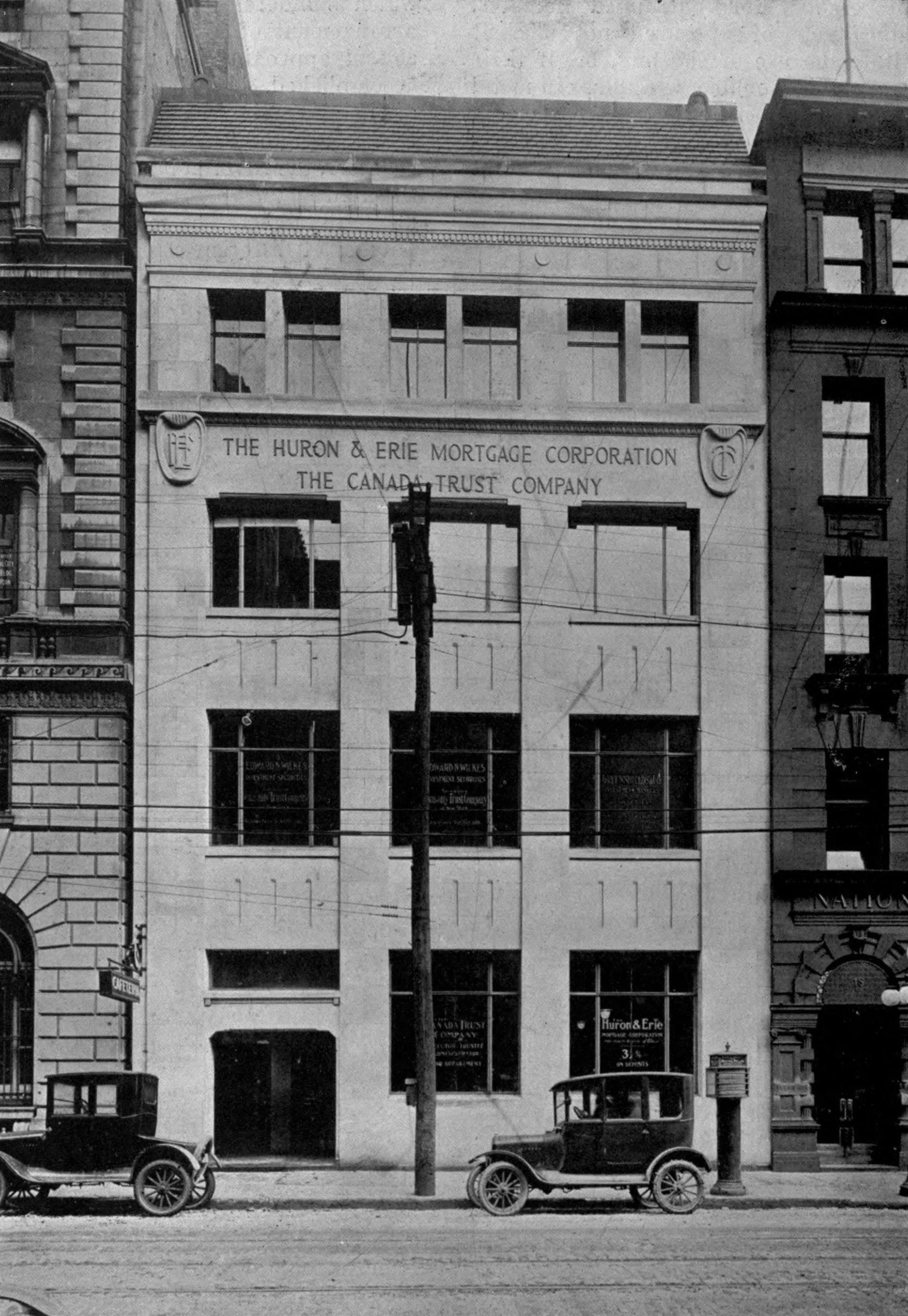
Toronto branch, 14 King Street East

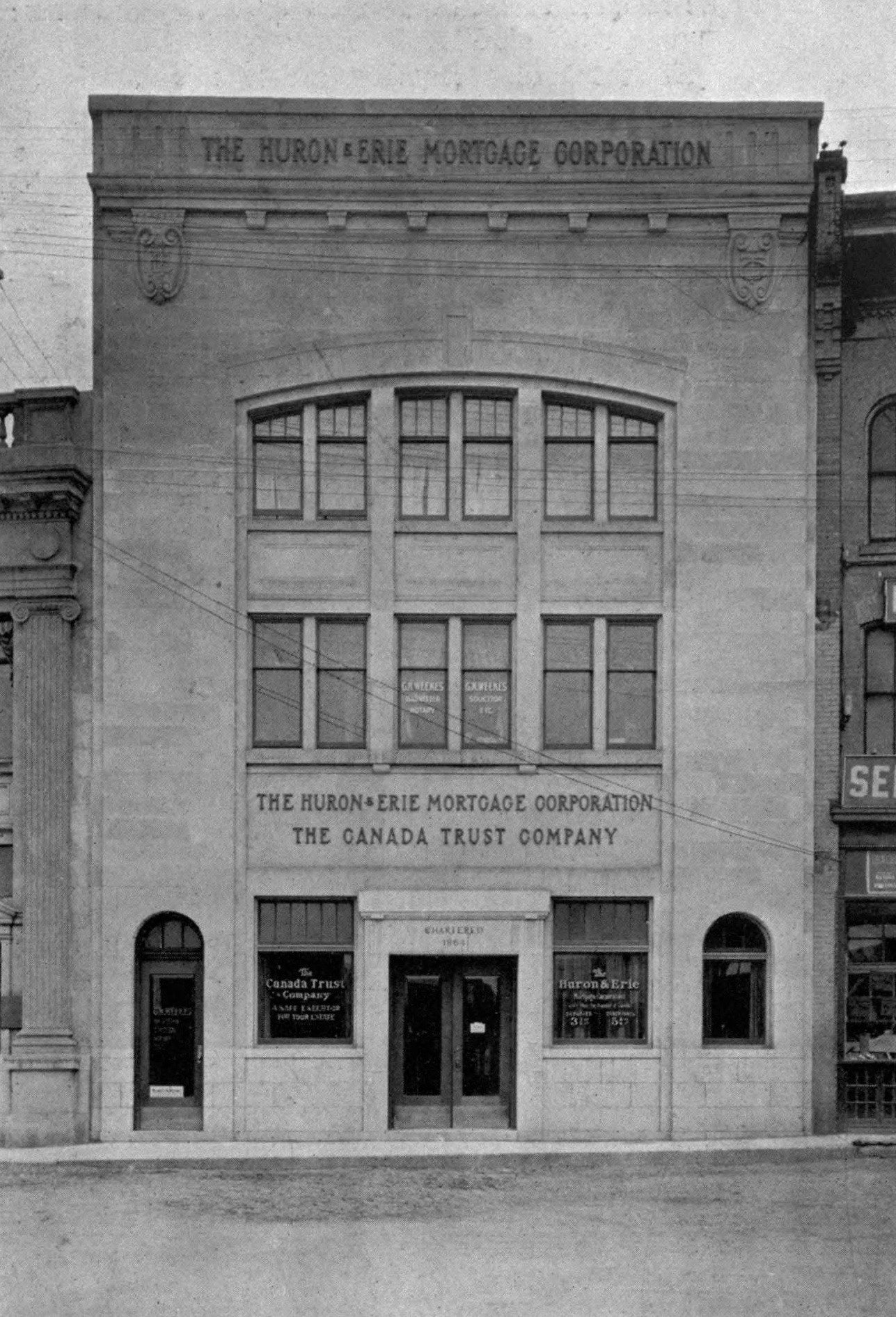
London (Market) branch, 4 Covent Market Place

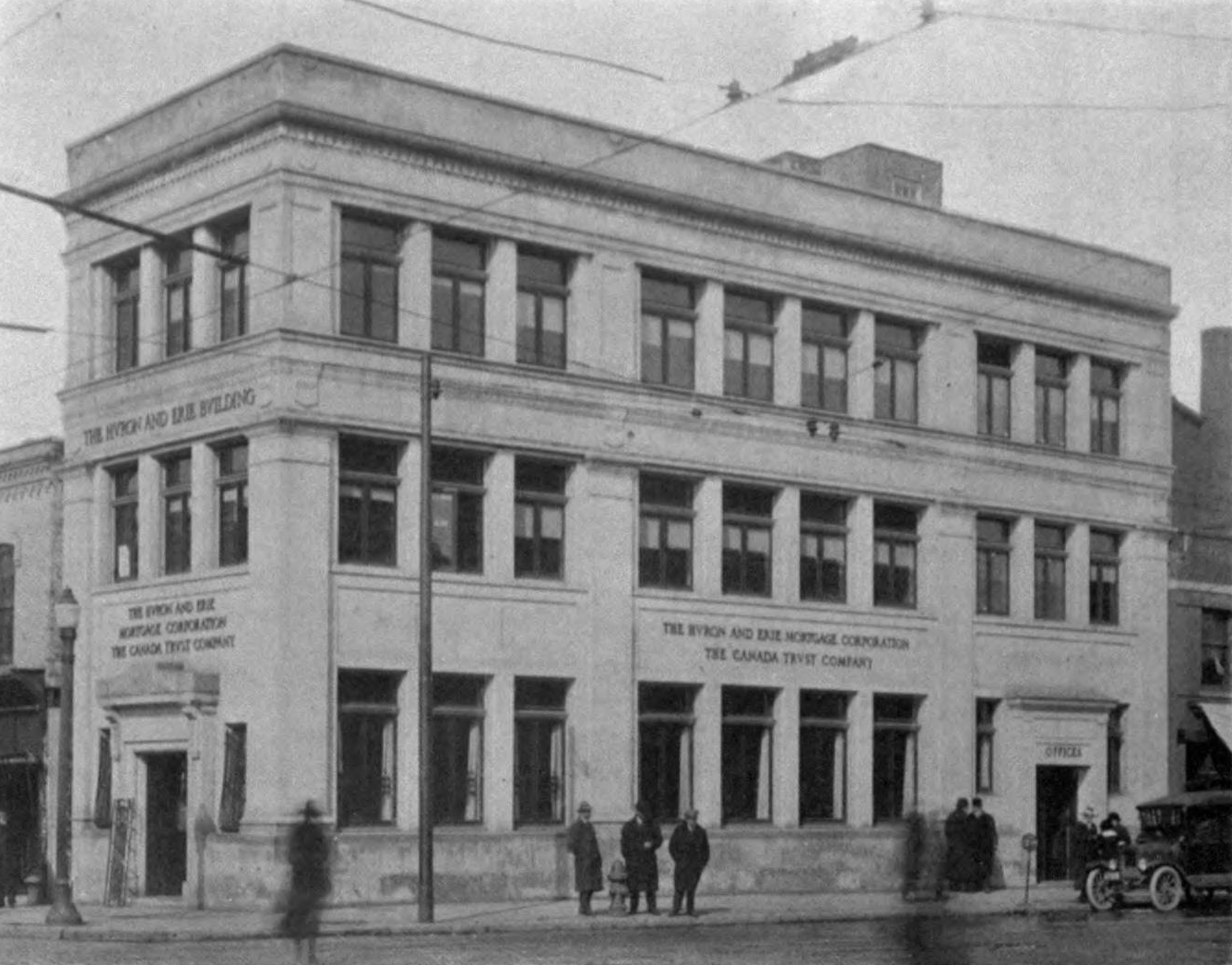
Windsor branch, 30 Ouellette Avenue

== Company histories ==
- Smith, Philip. The Trust-Builders: The Remarkable Rise of Canada Trust. Macmillan of Canada, 1989.
