= Canada Permanent =

Canadian trust company (1855–1985)

- Founded: 1 March 1855 (Mortgage); 7 March 1913 (Trust)
- Defunct: 31 December 1985
- Fate: Merged into Canada Trust
- Headquarters: Canada Permanent Building, Toronto, Ontario

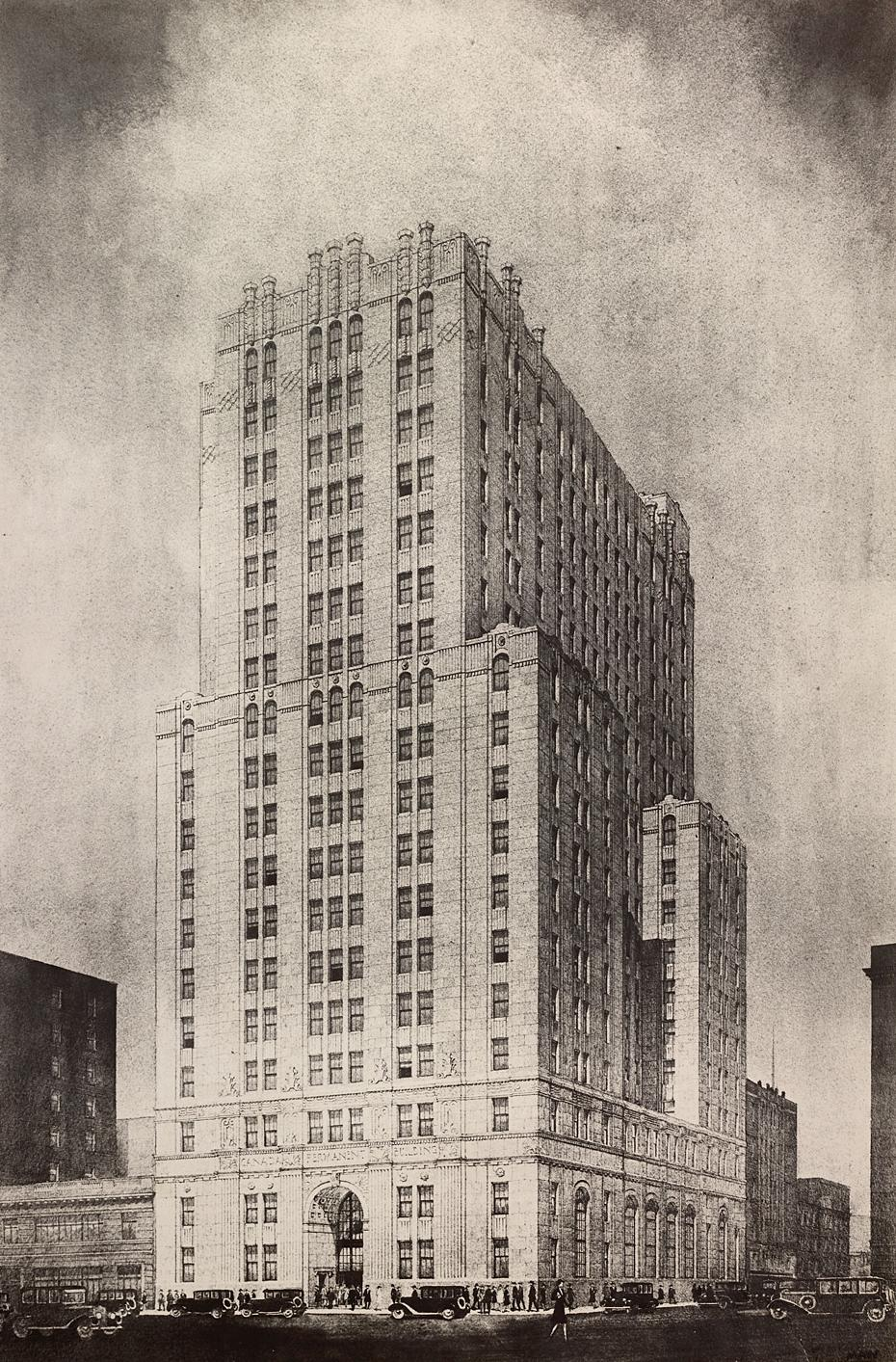
The company's new headquarters at 320 Bay opened in 1930.

Canada Permanent was the collective name for the Canada Permanent Mortgage Corporation and its subsidiary the Canada Permanent Trust Company. The company was formed in 1855 in Toronto by John Herbert Mason (1827–1911). In 1899, Permanent merged with Western Canada Loan and Savings, Freehold Loan and Savings, and the London and Ontario Investment Company. On 10 July 1899, the operations of the four companies were amalgamated into a new corporation called the Canada Permanent and Western Canada Mortgage Corporation. In 1903, it was renamed the Canada Permanent Mortgage Corporation.

In 1913, Canada Permanent Mortgage incorporated a subsidiary trust company called the Canada Permanent Trust Company.

By the 1980s, Canada Permanent was the country's fourth largest mortgage loan and trust company, after Canada Trust, Royal Trust, and National Trust. In 1981, Canada Permanent was acquired by Genstar. Then, in September 1985, Genstar acquired Canada Trust. On 31 December 1985, Genstar merged Canada Permanent's operations into Canada Trust, creating the country's sixth-largest financial institution. To complete the merger, Canada Permanent Mortgage was merged into Canada Trustco (formerly Huron & Erie, the holding company of Canada Trust), while Canada Permanent Trust merged into Canada Trust. In 2000, the Toronto-Dominion Bank acquired Canada Trust.

== Company histories ==
- Skodyn, Basil. The Permanent Story, 1855–1980. The Company, 1980.
- Stevens, George Roy. The Canada Permanent Story, 1855–1955. The Company, 1955.
