= Featherston Osler =

Canadian judge

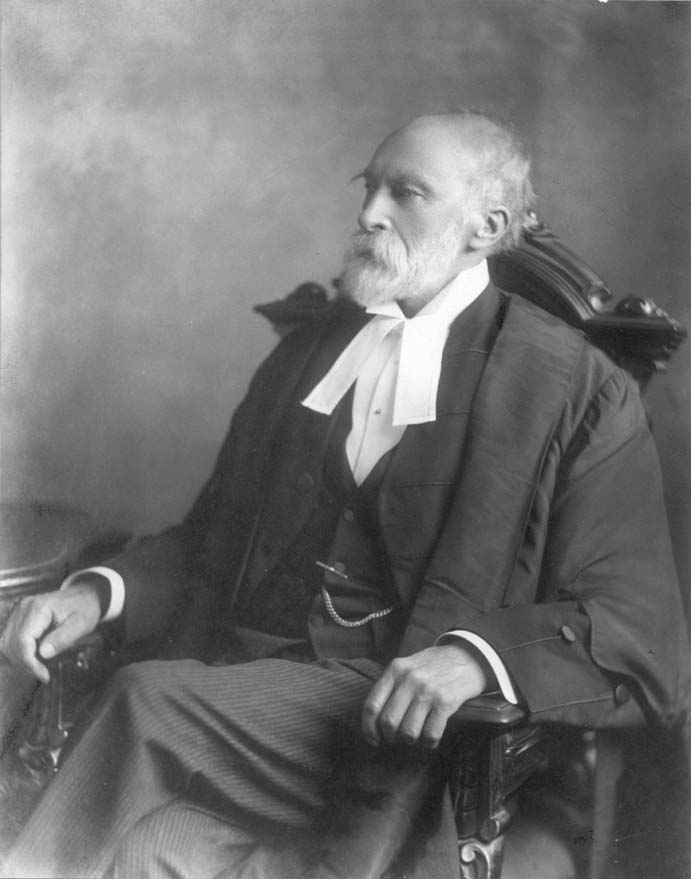
Osler circa 1905

Featherston Osler KC (January 4, 1838 – January 16, 1924) was a Canadian judge. He sat on Ontario's Court of Common Pleas from 1879 to 1883 and on the Court of Appeal for Ontario from 1883 to his retirement in March 1910.

Featherston Osler was born in Newmarket, Upper Canada, on January 4, 1838, to Ellen Tree (Picton) Osler and Featherstone Lake Osler, an Anglican cleric. He attended grammar schools in Barrie and Bond Head and Trinity College, Toronto. William Osler, Britton Bath Osler, and Edmund Boyd Osler were his siblings.

Osler was called to the bar of the Province of Canada in 1860, was created a King's Counsel in 1879, and practised in Toronto before his appointment to the Court of Common Pleas on March 5, 1879. Osler was elevated to the Court of Appeal on November 17, 1883. He was offered a position on the Supreme Court of Canada, but declined in October 1888. Osler retired from the bench in March 1910. He became treasurer of the Law Society of Upper Canada in 1921 and served until his death.

Osler died in Toronto on January 16, 1924.
