= Imasco =

Canadian conglomerate company

Imasco Limited
- Formerly: Imperial and Associates, Co.
- Company type: Public
- Traded as: TSX: IMS
- Industry: Tobacco; Restaurants; Pharmacies; Trusts
- Founded: 1970; 56 years ago
- Defunct: 2000
- Fate: Merged into Imperial Tobacco Canada
- Headquarters: Montreal, Quebec, Canada
- Area served: 42 US states and 42 countries
- Parent: British American Tobacco

Imasco Limited was a Canadian corporation headquartered in Montreal, Quebec, Canada. It was founded in 1970 as Imperial and Associates, Co.

== History ==
Imasco was the former owner of Imperial Tobacco Canada, Canada Trust, Shoppers Drug Mart, Genstar, and the Hardee's restaurant chain. The company sold Hardee's in 1997 to CKE, Canada Trust in 2000 to Toronto-Dominion Bank and Shopper's Drug Mart in 2000 to a consortium of institutional investors. British American Tobacco, or BAT, had owned 41.5% of Imasco's shares. In 2000, British American Tobacco purchased the remaining 58.5% shares in Imasco and amalgamated the company with Imperial Tobacco Canada Limited.
