= Trust company =

Financial institution offering certain services

A trust company is a corporation that acts as a fiduciary, trustee or agent of trusts and agencies. A professional trust company may be independently owned or owned by, for example, a bank or a law firm, and which specializes in being a trustee of various kinds of trusts.

The "trust" name refers to the ability to act as a trustee – someone who administers financial assets on behalf of another. The assets are typically held in the form of a trust, a legal instrument that spells out who the beneficiaries are and what the money can be spent for.

A trustee will manage investments, keep records, manage assets, prepare court accounting, pay bills (depending on the nature of the trust), medical expenses, charitable gifts, inheritances or other distributions of income and principal.

== Estate administration ==
A trust company can be named as an executor or personal representative in a last will and testament. The responsibilities of an executor in settling the estate of a deceased person include collecting debts, settling claims for debt and taxes, accounting for assets to the courts and distributing wealth to beneficiaries.

Estate planning is usually also offered to allow clients to structure their affairs so as to minimize inheritance taxes and probate costs. In the United States, one of the primary profit centers for a trust company is commissions earned from selling various types of insurance products designed to minimize the estate tax charged to a person.

A trust officer may provide guardian and conservator services, acting as guardian of a minor's property until adulthood or as conservator of the estate of an adult unable to handle his or her own finances.

=== Environmental and historic preservation trusts ===
Some trust companies are formed not merely for the benefit of a minor or an individual trustee, but for the preservation of nature or historic sites.

== Asset management ==
A trust department provides investment management, including securities market advice, investment strategy and portfolio management, management of real estate and safekeeping of valuables.

== Escrow services ==
The trust company may also provide escrow services, invest education or retirement funds or hold 1031 Exchange proceeds where cash from the sale of US real estate is held in trust (for tax purposes) until used to buy replacement land.

== Corporate trust services ==
Trust companies may also perform corporate trust services. Corporate trust services are services which assist, in the fiduciary capacity, in the administration of the corporation's debt. For example, in a normal bank loan, the lender normally lends money to the company (usually with conditions called "covenants"), accepts payments from the company monthly, and monitors the financial conditions of the company to ensure that it is meeting all its agreed upon conditions (for example, that its ratio of profits to expenses stays above a certain amount). However most large companies borrow money not from banks, but by selling bonds. When the company sells bonds, a corporate trust company can handle the acceptance of payments from the company (which it passes on to the bondholders), and is the entity which monitors the company to ensure it is meeting covenants. In the event of the company's bankruptcy, the corporate trust company represents the interests of the bondholders and acts to recover as much of the loan proceeds as possible.

== Canadian banking services ==
In Canada, trust companies have historically provided many of the same services as the big-five banks. They are legally not banks, but hold a "near"-bank status which situates them legally very close to the US savings and loan associations, UK building societies or other non-bank deposit-taking institutions such as credit unions.

According to the Canadian Office of the Superintendent of Financial Institutions, "trust and loan companies are financial institutions that operate under either provincial or federal legislation and conduct activities similar to those of a bank". Deposits and GICs are insured by the Canadian Deposit Insurance Corporation in the same manner as bank deposits.

While Canadian trust and loan companies nominally cannot accept retail deposits or issue debentures, they may receive money on deposit in trust, repayable on demand or after notice. As no statute prevents the companies from according chequing privileges to their depositors, effectively the trust companies are at liberty to receive monies which the depositor can treat much like bank savings or chequing accounts. The institution may then employ these assets (less a legally-required fractional reserve) to issue secured loans, such as mortgages.

Once a common feature on Canada's retail banking landscape, free-standing retail trust companies are disappearing; the largest institutions have increasingly fallen prey to consolidation and takeover by the major banks. Prominent examples include Canada Trust (founded 1864 as Huron and Erie Savings and Loan Society, acquired by Toronto-Dominion Bank in 2000), Montreal Trust Company (established 1889, acquired by Scotiabank in 1994), National Trust Company (established 1898, acquired by Scotiabank in 1997) and Royal Trust (founded 1892, bought by Royal Bank of Canada in 1993). A few small or captive trust and loan companies, such as the Equitable Trust Company, B2B Trust and Civil Service Loan Corporation, have restructured to legally become federally-regulated banks.

Unlike banks, Canadian trust companies can administer estates, trusts, and pension plans. Banks cannot conduct these activities unless they are done through a separately created trust subsidiary. In 2023, there were 43 federally-regulated trust companies in Canada but many of these were owned or controlled by banks or other institutions as subsidiaries.

== See also ==
- Trust (business)
- Antitrust
- Monopolies
- Nobel Foundation
