= Genstar Development Company =

Canadian real estate company

Genstar Development Company (Canada)
- Type: Private
- Industry: Real estate
- Founded: 1950
- Headquarters: San Diego, California, United States
- Key people: Frank L. Thomas (CEO)
- Products: Real estate development
- Number of employees: 30
- Website: www.genstar.com

Genstar Development Company is a Canadian real estate development company. Today, Genstar has active projects in Calgary, Edmonton and Winnipeg.

== History ==
The company's origins date back to 1950 as BACM Industries founded by the Simkin Family in Winnipeg. In 1973, BACM Industries was sold to Genstar Corporation and was renamed Genstar Development Company. At that time, the Company operated in Winnipeg, Edmonton, Calgary, and Vancouver. Soon after, operations were added in Toronto and then Ottawa. In the late 1970s the Company also started operations in the United States.

In 1986, Genstar Corporation was acquired by Imasco Limited. By 1991, Genstar had active development operations in Minnesota, San Diego, Los Angeles, Portland, Tampa, Atlanta and Houston - all under the banner of Genstar Land Company.

In 1999, senior management orchestrated a management buyout and acquired the assets of Genstar in Canada and formed GDC Communities in the United States. GDC Communities plays two roles, it owns Genstar Development Company (Canada) and directs the development of its Canadian master planned communities, and secondly, it provides the foundation for the US investments and operations.
