= Commerce Bank =

Commerce Bank may refer to:

== Banks ==
=== United States ===
- Commerce Bancshares, a bank based in Missouri, with branches in numerous Midwestern states
- Commerce Bank, a subsidiary of Commerce Bancshares
- Commerce Bank & Trust Company, Worcester, Massachusetts
- Commerce Bank Harrisburg, an independent franchise of Commerce Bancorp in Harrisburg, Pennsylvania, U.S.
- Commerce Bank & Trust of Topeka, former name of CoreFirst Bank & Trust, Topeka, Kansas
- Commerce National Bank, Columbus, Ohio
- Global Commerce Bank, Doraville, Georgia
- Texas Commerce Bank, acquired by Chemical Banking Corporation of New York in 1987
- Virginia Commerce Bank, acquired by United Bank of West Virginia in 2014

=== Other places ===
- Bangladesh Commerce Bank Limited, in Dhaka, Bangladesh
- Housing and Commerce Bank, a bank in Asmara, Eritrea

== Sports ==
- Commerce Bank Championship, a golf tournament on the Champions Tour
- Commerce Bank Park, former name of FNB Field
- Commerce Bank Park (New Jersey), former name of TD Bank Ballpark

== Other uses ==
- Commerce Bank Arts Centre, former name of Investors Bank Performing Arts Center, Washington Township, New Jersey, U.S.

== See also ==
- Commerzbank, a bank based in Frankfurt, Germany
- Commerce Bancorp, a defunct bank based in Cherry Hill, New Jersey, U.S.
