= Vernon Hill =

American businessman (born 1945)

Vernon W. Hill II
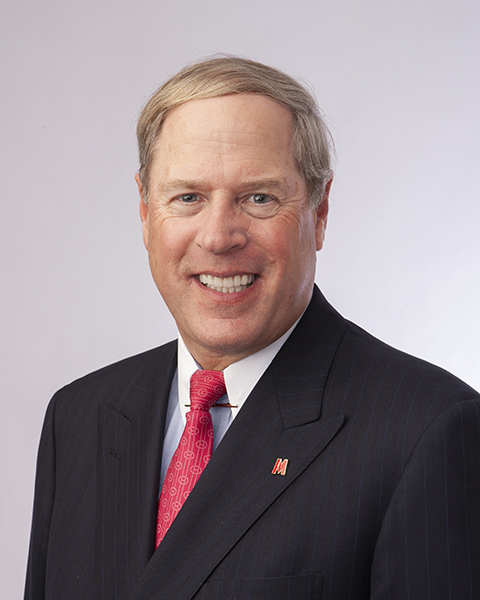
- Vernon Hill in 2008
- Born: August 18, 1945 (age 81)
- Known for: Founder of Metro Bank
- Spouse: Shirley Hill
- Children: 4

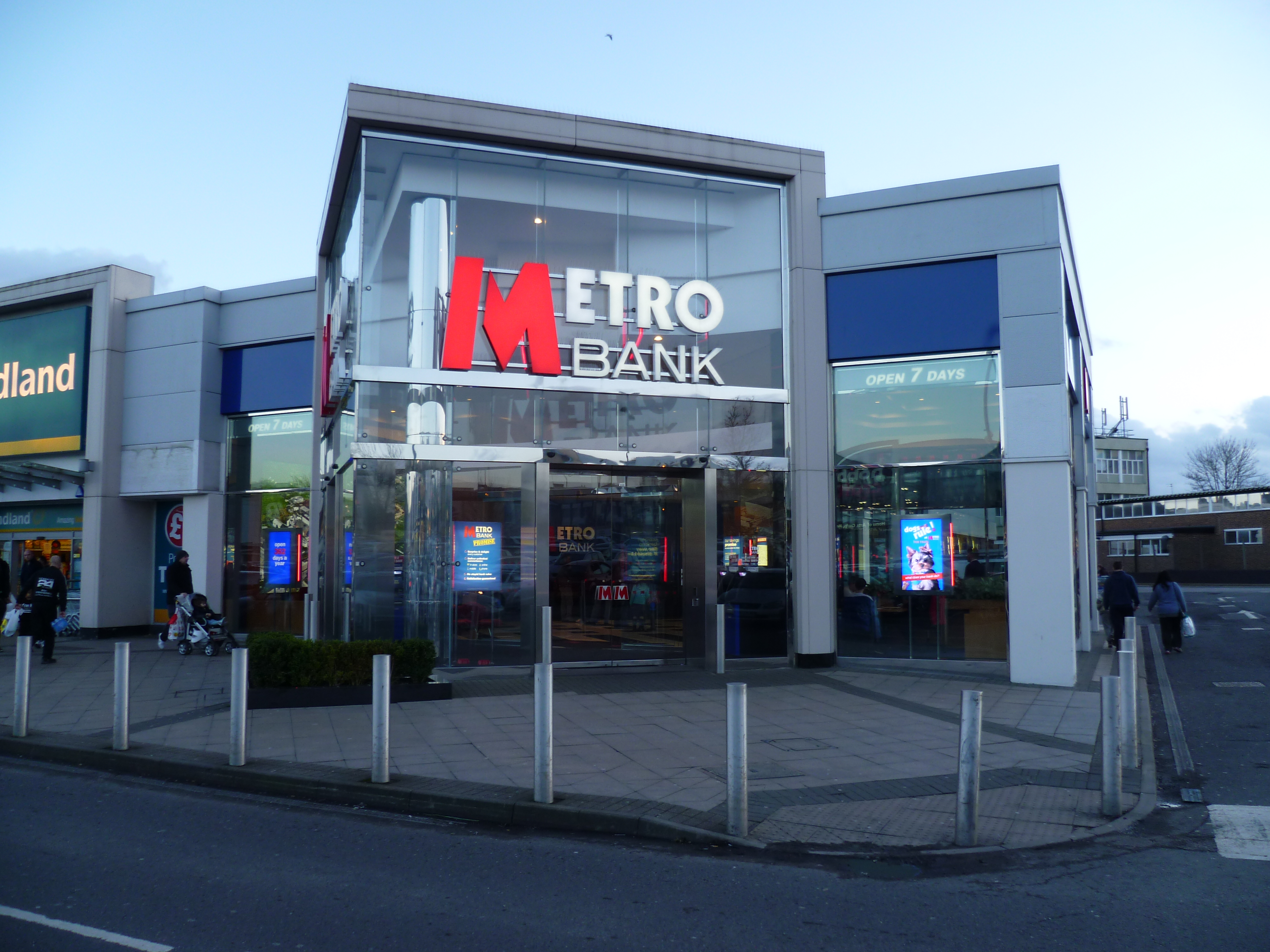
Metro Bank, Borehamwood

Vernon W. Hill II (born August 18, 1945) is an American businessman, the founder and former chairman of Metro Bank, a UK retail bank with 77 stores, and assets of £7.4b ($10.6b). He was also the founder, former chairman, president and CEO of Commerce Bancorp of Cherry Hill, New Jersey, and chairman of pet insurance firm Fetch Inc. In 2016, Hill was named chairman of Philadelphia-based Republic Bank.

== Early career ==
Although known for banking, Hill's business outlook has been informed by early encounters with retailing. While taking morning classes at Wharton, Hill worked afternoons at a South Jersey bank owned by a local car retailer, where Hill observed the car dealer applying retail principles to banking operations, such as late opening hours. The job also brought Hill into contact with other local retailers, including McDonald's. After graduation Hill founded a real estate firm to find and develop sites for McDonald's, a task which required Hill to drive McDonald's entrepreneur Ray Kroc on scouting trips. Hill claims his experience with McDonald's taught him the importance of standardised presentation and scale economies in retailing.

Philadelphia Magazine reported that Hill's experience with McDonald's led directly to the creation of Commerce Bank. Referring to the creation of Commerce, Morton Kerr, chairman of the board of Markeim-Chalmers, Inc., a South Jersey real estate firm, and one of the original Commerce board members, observed:

"A lot of us knew Vernon from being involved in real estate at that time…He was a 26-year-old kid who called about 15 of us to a meeting in his office. I'll never forget it. He said, 'We're going to start a bank.' And he said we'd each have to put up between $25,000 and $125,000. This was 1973-who had that kind of money? But he'd arranged for all of us to borrow it. If you could put up $100,000, he got us loans for $80,000. Only seven of us didn't get up and walk out, but we still thought he was crazy."

The deal resulted in Commerce opening its first branch in Marlton, New Jersey, in 1973.

== Commerce Bancorp ==
Commerce Bank was notable for its rapid expansion, from one branch in 1973 to 470 branches in 2008, and a deposit base that grew by an average of 25% per year between 1996 and 2001 (against an industry average of 5% in 2001). According to Forbes Magazine, Commerce produced a 23% annual shareholder return compounded for 30 years.

Commerce Bank's economic model rested on the idea that the fixed costs of a bank branch are largely independent of volume, and so profitability lay in maximizing the number of deposits and accounts per branch. Additionally, Hill believed that the industry's reliance on internet banking had led to dis-investment in bank branches, to the detriment of consumers who prioritised in-person service.

“Other banks decided to push consumers out of the branch because it is the high-cost delivery channel. They wanted to push them online. We totally reject that. You can't name me one retailer in this country that has pushed people where they don't want to go and succeeded...We have some branches that get 100,000 customer visits a month; the average branch gets 40,000. An average McDonald’s gets 25,000 per month.”

Hill's motto for Commerce was “America’s most convenient bank”.

Commerce Bank staff were awarded $5,000 if a nearby rival bank closed its branches; hundreds of mystery shoppers made tens of thousands of store visits annually, and salary increases were based on mystery shopping scores. Top-performing managers were given sports cars.

On June 29, 2007, Hill resigned as chairman and CEO of Commerce Bancorp after the Office of the Comptroller of the Currency, the Federal Reserve Bank of Philadelphia and the board of directors of Commerce Bancorp established governance to stop doing business with firms under the control of Hill's family. Notable business dealings with insiders included property leases with entities in which Hill was a partner, and the purchase of services from an architectural design business run by his wife, Shirley. No charges were brought.

On October 2, 2007, Commerce Bancorp announced that it would be merging with TD Bank Financial Group. The Canadian-based Toronto-Dominion Bank acquired Commerce for $8.5 billion (U.S. dollars) in cash and stock, at $42 per share of CBH stock, a purchase multiple of x28. Some industry commentators held that Hill's departure and a strong Canadian dollar had made a takeover inevitable.

== Petplan ==
Hill is chairman of Fetch Inc., a pet health insurance company founded by Chris and Natasha Ashton. It holds the U.S. and Canadian franchise from British pet insurance firm Petplan, the world's biggest provider of policies for pets. Hill invested in the company in April 2008, believing pet health to be a growth market in the USA.

Speaking to Fortune in 2010, Hill said, "People used to put down their pets when they got sick. Now they're members of the family. People will want to save them with kidney transplants and hip replacements. This business will be huge."

== Metro Bank ==
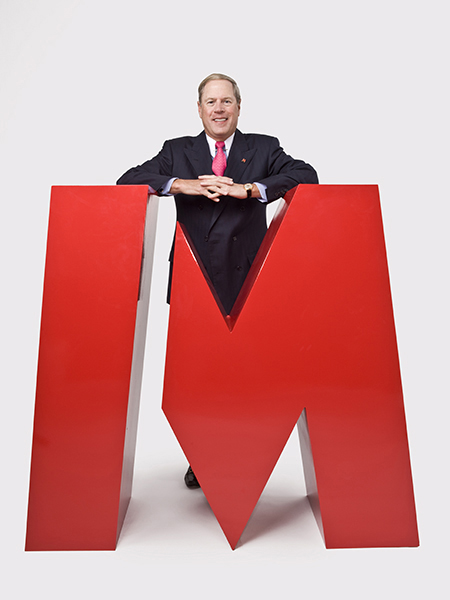
Vernon Hill in 2008

Metro Bank UK was launched in London in July 2010, with Hill as co-founder and vice-chairman.

Press commentary at the time centred on Metro being the first high-street bank to open in the United Kingdom for more than 100 years, and upon Hill's belief that the competitive landscape of British banking amounted to a commercial opportunity to lead on service rather than price. In 2010, 85% of the UK market for current accounts was held by the "big five" banking institutions (HSBC, Barclays, Royal Bank of Scotland, Santander and Lloyds). In 2008, an official report from the Office of Fair Trading concluded that UK banking was subject to weak competitive pressures and profit-maximising strategies. Forbes magazine described Metro at launch as "...aiming to disrupt a storied industry dominated by a handful of established players".

In a BBC News interview, Thomson commented that the cost–driven model of traditional British banks required them to discourage customers from visiting branches, whereas Metro Bank's model actively sought to attract customers into branches, using tactics such as longer opening hours and pet-friendly policies.

The pair spent a further two years securing a £75m launch investment, including funds from New York real estate developer Richard LeFrak, property investors the Reuben brothers and Fidelity, the fund management company. Metro was launched with plans to open 200 branches in London by 2020. Twelve branches were opened by December 2010. In June 2012, the company announced the completion of a £126m round of capital-raising to open further branches in London, including funds from Moore Capital and the billionaire investor Steve Cohen.

The noted investor Wilbur Ross commented, "The question is whether [Hill’s] promotional flair and service concept will produce enough customers to offset the extra operational cost of providing the extra space".

Hill, who previously served as Metro's vice chairman, replaced his co-founder Anthony Thomson as chairman in January 2013.

In September 2013, Metro had 225,000 accounts and was opening a new branch every month with a goal of opening 25 by the close of the year.

In April 2013, Hill was awarded the Institute of Economic Affairs' Free Enterprise Award, whose previous winners include Margaret Thatcher and Sir Richard Branson, for his work at Metro. The IEA noted that Hill "has identified a clear opportunity and entered the UK banking scene at a time when the sector has been under constant fire" and showed "incredible perseverance and imagination", while IEA director general Mark Littlewood praised Metro Bank as "a shining example of innovation improving people's live. It's refreshing to see more competition and choice in the banking sector on our high streets".

In August 2013, Tom Brown of Bankstocks.com wrote, "So Vernon Hill has, not once, but twice, and in two different markets, built growth machines in the supposedly mature and sleepy banking business. That has to make him the world’s greatest growth-oriented banker, probably of all time." In the same month, Hill received the 2013 Stevie Award for International Chairman of the Year.

In 2018, Hill faced criticism when it was reported that Metro Bank had engaged his wife's architecture firm, paying it £21m in fees, and also for his use of a £120,000 per year company expense allowance.

Hill stepped down as chairman in October 2019. He remains on the board as a non-executive director, and will leave the board officially at the end of 2019.

== Republic Bank ==
Hill became chairman of Republic First Bancorp doing business as Republic Bank in 2016. He became chief executive officer in 2021, and was fired in May 2022.

== Book ==
Hill is the author of Fans Not Customers: How to Create Growth Companies in a No Growth World, which was published by Profile Books in October 2012. It argues that it is better to have fans rather than customers and urges businesses to compete on service rather than price. The Financial Times reviewed Hill's writing style as "refreshingly to the point" and said that "for those looking for an alternate way of approaching service, the book will prove rich pickings".

== Other investments ==
Hill was a partner with Steve Lewis in US Restaurants Inc, which operated 34 Burger King restaurants in metropolitan Philadelphia.

Hill's first business was Site Development Inc, a real estate development firm which has developed over 1000 shopping centres and retail developments in America.

In 1994, Hill, along with partners John Silvestri and Steve Lewis, founded and developed Galloway National Golf Club near Atlantic City, New Jersey. The course was designed by Tom Fazio and is ranked by GolfDigest.com as being among the top 100 courses in America.

== Business philosophy ==
Fortune Magazine describes Hill as a "flamboyant, tradition-stomping American billionaire" and "the P.T. Barnum of banking".

Hill has often advocated a business development strategy based on organic growth rather than acquisition, and by generating customer loyalty through service rather than price. Speaking to a 2010 House of Commons Treasury Select Committee on competition and choice in the banking sector, Hill said:

"My opinion is that great retailers never grow by acquisition…If you see yourself as a retailer delivering an unusual service, acquisitions are the easiest way to kill your model…[Organic growth] is slower, but you get what you want at the end. You get a group of people running your model, not somebody else’s model…."

Hill is a critic of the shadow banking system, believing it to largely responsible for the 2008 financial crisis.

"We have two American banking systems. We have the normal banking system, with 8,000 banks serving consumers and businesses throughout America. Then we developed a shadow banking system…the money market funds, the investment banks, the credit default swaps. The current crisis is really a crisis of this shadow banking system….I think when [banks] are making a loan to, say, a restaurant, the overwhelming majority of banks aren’t playing games. As long as the guy’s paying, it’s a loan that pays back over time. Then we moved into all this exotic stuff — credit default swaps, CDOs. Believe me, no one at Goldman Sachs understands what they have on their books, because these kids are sitting at their computers dreaming this stuff up…."

Hill is often quoted as viewing his banks to be in the retail business rather than the banking business.

"You don't have to think about what time a Home Depot, a McDonald's or a Starbucks is open," Hill says. "They're open. You just go. My theory was, if you advertise that [your bank is] open on Sunday, the consumer will automatically believe you're open all the time. That message is more important than the savings."

In its 2007 20-20-20 Club, Forbes magazine listed Hill as one of seven CEOs (along with Warren Buffett and Larry Ellison) of publicly traded companies with tenures of over 20 years to deliver an annual shareholder return in excess of 20%. Commerce produced a 23% annual compounded shareholder return over that time.

== Personal life ==
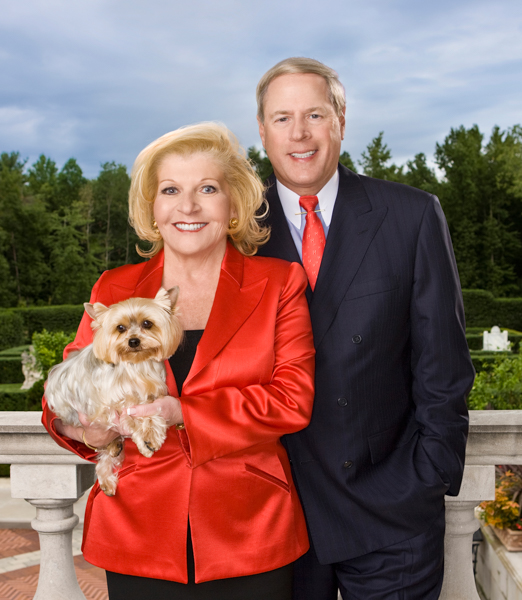
Shirley and Vernon Hill in 2008

Hill is the son of a Virginia real estate brokerage owner and the eldest of six children. He graduated from Wharton School of the University of Pennsylvania in Philadelphia in 1967, earning a BS in economics with a concentration in finance.

Hill's 46,000 ft^{2} (4,270 m^{2}) home, Villa Collina, is located in Moorestown Township, New Jersey. The home has an orangery. Hill has been married for 40 years to Shirley Hill, who is the founder of InterArch, the architectural and branding firm responsible for the branding for Commerce Bank and Metro Bank. The couple have four children, and Sir Duffield, their Yorkshire terrier.

The Hill Family Foundation supports various charitable organisations in both the US and Britain. It is one of the largest supporters of veterinary causes, including:

- A $10 million gift for the Vernon and Shirley Hill Pavilion at the School of Veterinary Medicine at the University of Pennsylvania, Vernon's alma mater.
- The Penn World Veterinary Award
- The UK Kennel Club Achievement Award
