= Saladworks =

Restaurant franchise

Saladworks LLC
- Trade name: Saladworks
- Type: Private
- Industry: Restaurants
- Genre: Fast Casual
- Founded: October 1, 1986
- Headquarters: United States
- Number of locations: 150
- Area served: United States; Canada
- Key people: Kelly Roddy, President and CEO
- Products: Salads, wraps, soups, grain bowls, sandwiches and paninis
- Services: Franchising
- Owner: Centre Lane Partners
- Number of employees: 1,500 (2020)
- Website: saladworks.com

Saladworks, LLC is a restaurant franchise that serves made-to-order entrée salads, wraps, soups, and sandwiches. Saladworks restaurants are categorized as fast casual, and the company markets its menu as a healthy alternative to other fast food fare. The franchise currently operates 150 restaurant locations in 22 states and is developing locations internationally. It continues to develop exclusively through its Multiple Unit Development approach, focusing on development in metropolitan areas throughout the United States. The restaurant chain also has stores in Canada.

== History ==
Saladworks was founded on October 1, 1986, by John Scardapane, who served as the company's CEO until 2015, and Gail Scardapane, who served as the company's Head of Brand and President. The first Saladworks opened in the Cherry Hill Mall, the success of which inspired the opening of 12 additional locations in New Jersey and Pennsylvania.

Saladworks began franchising in 2001, and by 2007 had 88 locations in eight states, including Pennsylvania, New Jersey, Delaware, Maryland, Florida, and Illinois. Today, the franchise operates over 150 restaurant locations in 24 states and has announced plans to expand into new markets in the United States and internationally.

=== Bankruptcy and sale ===
Scardapane and Hill in 2008

In 2008, Scardapane sold a 30 percent stake in Saladworks to Vernon Hill, the founder of Commerce Bancorp, who invested about $7.5 million in the company. Hill resigned from the company's board of directors in 2013 and exercised his right to have Saladworks buy back his shares for $7.8 million. In October 2014, he sued the company in Delaware seeking the payment. The company was also sued by its lender, Metro Bank, over $2.5 million in debt.

In February 2015, Saladworks filed for Chapter 11 bankruptcy in the United States Bankruptcy Court for the District of Delaware, citing the lawsuits from its bank and its minority owner, and put itself up for sale. Hill's claim in the bankruptcy totaled $8.9 million.

Centre Lane Partners, a New York City-based private equity firm, acquired Saladworks out of bankruptcy in June 2015 for $16.9 million, including $15 million in cash, $1.2 million for a brand development fund, and assumed liabilities. The sale was expected to pay Hill and the company's other creditors in full. Centre Lane promoted Saladworks president Paul Steck to CEO, replacing founder John Scardapane, who had owned 70 percent of the company.

== Restaurant redesign ==
In October 2008, Saladworks began a major branding change, unveiling a new design prototype. Existing restaurants that have adopted the new design, as well as all new Saladworks locations built around the new design, have been dubbed “3G Restaurants” by the company. Changes include refrigerated salad display cases, the omission of menu boards, diffused artificial lighting to emulate daylight entering through skylights, and a higher level of design consistency across all Saladworks locations.

== Programs ==
=== Signature Series ===
In January 2008, Saladworks launched its Signature Series, which had four celebrity chefs creating a line of seasonal salads.

=== True Nutrition ===
To increase the nutritional values of its menu and ensure all pre-made signature salads averaged less than 500 calories, Saladworks unveiled True Nutrition in April 2010, a new menu with over 50 salad ingredients such as avocado, edamame, and chick peas.

== Industry ranking ==
In 2012 Entrepreneur Magazine ranked Saladworks #416 of the top 500 franchises in America. The company was also included as one of "10 Great Franchise Deals" in a 2010 article by Daniel P. Smith in QSR Magazine.
