= Petplan =

Petplan may refer to:

- Petplan UK, British pet insurance firm
- Petplan Australia, Australian pet insurance firm
- Fetch by the Dodo, U.S. pet insurance firm formerly known as Petplan
