= Dysthanasia (animal) =

Prolonging the life of a dying animal

A geriatric mastiff with multiple tumors is being prepared for palliative surgery.

Animal dysthanasia (from the Greek: δυσ, dus; "bad, difficult" + θάνατος, thanatos; "death") refers to the practice of prolonging the life of animals that are seriously or even terminally ill and that are potentially experiencing suffering. Animal dysthanasia is a recent concept, emerging from changes in the social perception of animals and from advances in veterinary care.

== Context ==
Animal dysthanasia is particularly relevant in the context of small animal practice. For centuries, domestic animals in Western societies used to be mainly farm animals. With the industrialization process, humans become increasingly concentrated in urban areas, having preferential contact with companion animals, namely cats and dogs. While farm animals are widely seen as property, companion animals are perceived as family members with whom humans keep close bonds and develop strong emotional relationships.

At the same time, scientific advances in the field of veterinary medicine enable practitioners to reach accurate diagnoses faster and more reliably than before, allowing life-threatening illnesses to be identified in the early stages of their development. In addition, more advanced options of treatment are currently available which may sometimes be used to prolong the lives of animals as much as possible regardless of their quality.

The Companion Animal Euthanasia Training Academy (CAETA) defines dysthanasia differently. To align more closely with the current definition of euthanasia, the act of humanely terminating life, CAETA views dysthanasia as the opposite of euthanasia; an actual bad death event wherein the medical act of euthanasia went poorly. Any lack of care or suffering leading up to death is considered a lack of veterinary hospice support during the end of life.

== Causes ==
Decision upon animal euthanasia often takes into account the relief of pain and suffering. Depending on how one defines the term, animal dysthanasia occurs because there is no agreement upon the acceptable and recognizable endpoints of the lives of companion animals. This is due to several reasons. The keeper (guardian; owner) may wish to extend the animal’s life because he rejects euthanasia as an acceptable solution. On the other hand, the veterinarian may have a scientific interest on studying the progress of a specific illness or even a financial interest in keeping the patient alive. If one defines dysthanasia as an actual bad death event, causes include use of improper euthanasia techniques or failure to render an animal free of pain or distress. Proper training in euthanasia procedures is ideal to reduce dysthanasia and subsequent suffering. The keeper and the veterinarian may also want to make use of all possible treatment resources before making the decision of euthanasia. Genuine belief on the animal’s recovery and emotional attachment can also interfere in the decision-making process of euthanasia. Situations like these can be especially problematic in some veterinary specialities like small animal oncology where the course of the disease may be difficult to predict and the treatments themselves can cause severe distress.

== See also ==
- Dysthanasia
- Animal loss
- Animal welfare
- Palliative care
- Animal euthanasia
