= Animal euthanasia =

Veterinary procedure

Animal euthanasia (from Ancient Greek: εὐθανασία, lit. 'good death') is the act of killing an animal humanely, most commonly with injectable drugs. Animal euthanasia is distinct from animal slaughter. Euthanasia methods are designed to minimize pain and distress.

Euthanasia is often used to end an animal's suffering from terminal (and especially painful) conditions or diseases. Euthanasia is typically considered when there is a lack of resources to continue supporting the animal, or after laboratory test procedures.

For domesticated animals, the discussion of animal euthanasia is often substituted with euphemisms, such as "put down" or "put to sleep".

== Methods ==
Methods of euthanasia can be divided into pharmacological and physical methods. Acceptable pharmacological methods include injected drugs and gases that first depress the central nervous system and then cardiovascular activity. Acceptable physical methods must cause rapid loss of consciousness by disrupting the central nervous system. The most common methods are discussed here, but other acceptable methods are used in different situations.

=== Intravenous anesthetic ===
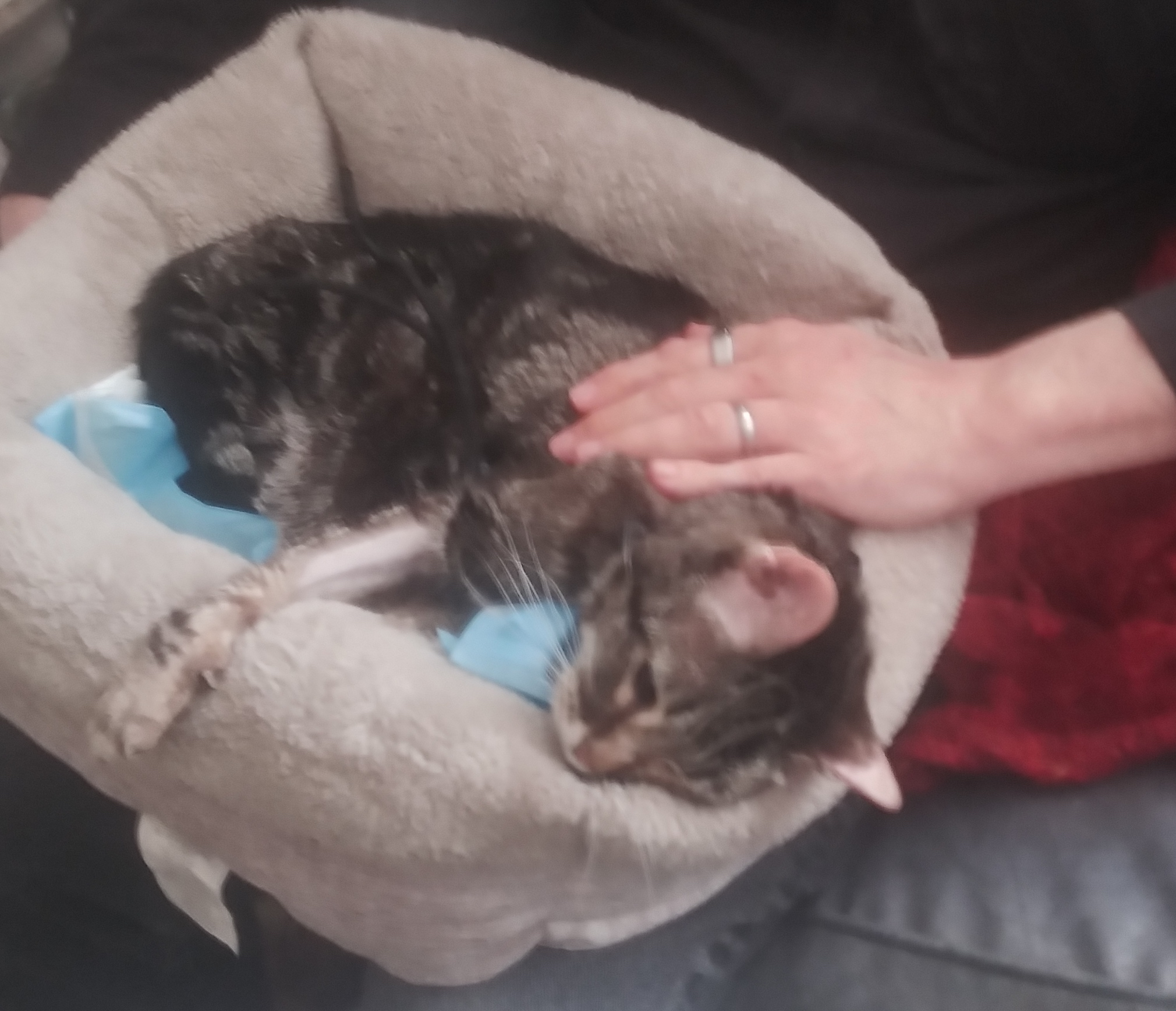
Cat with leg shaved for catheterization

Upon administration of intravenous anesthetic, unconsciousness (followed by respiratory and then cardiac arrest) occurs rapidly, usually within 30 seconds.

The two-stage process that some veterinarians use includes an initial injection of a sedative to make the animal more comfortable, followed by a second injection that euthanizes the animal. This allows the owner the chance to say goodbye to their pet without their emotions stressing the animal. It also greatly mitigates any tendency toward spasm and other involuntary movements, which tends to increase the owners emotional distress.

For large animals, the volume of barbiturates required are considered impractical by some, although this is standard practice in the United States. For horses and cattle, other drugs may be available. Some specially formulated combination products such as Somulose (secobarbital/cinchocaine) and Tributame (embutramide/chloroquine/lidocaine) are available to cause deep unconsciousness and cardiac arrest independently with a lower volume of injection, thus making the process faster, safer, and more effective.

Occasionally, a horse injected with these mixtures may display apparent seizure activity before death. This may be due to premature cardiac arrest. However, if typical precautions (e.g., sedation with detomidine) are taken, this is rarely a problem. Anecdotal reports that long-term use of phenylbutazone increases the risk of this reaction are unverified.

After the animal has died, it is not uncommon for the body to exhibit postmortem jerks or a sudden postmortem bladder or bowel evacuation. This is caused by the muscles of the deceased animal's body relaxing.

=== Inhalants ===
Gas anesthetics such as isoflurane and sevoflurane can be used to euthanasize very small animals. The animals are placed in sealed chambers and high levels of anesthetic gas are introduced. Death may also be induced using carbon dioxide once unconsciousness has been achieved by inhalation of an anesthetic. Carbon dioxide is often used on its own for the euthanasia of wild animals. There are mixed opinions on whether carbon dioxide causes distress when used on its own. Human studies provide evidence that it can cause distress, while studies involving nonhumans show equivocal results. In 2013, the American Veterinary Medical Association (AVMA) issued new guidelines for carbon dioxide induction, stating that a flow rate of 10% to 30% volume/min is optimal for the humane euthanasia of small rodents.

Carbon monoxide is often used, but some states in the United States have banned its use in animal shelters. Although carbon monoxide poisoning is not particularly painful, the conditions in the gas chamber are often not humane. Nitrogen is effective, although some young animals are more resistant to the effects, and it is currently not widely used.

The use of gas chambers is not the most humane form of euthanasia, as it can take up to 20 minutes to fully euthanise the animal. If the chambers are not calibrated correctly or the animal is ill, the process is only delayed further, which can cause more harm to the animal.

=== Cervical dislocation ===
Cervical dislocation, or displacement (breaking or fracturing) of the neck, is an older and less common method of killing small animals such as mice. When performed properly, it is intended to cause death as quickly and painlessly as possible without the need for specialized equipment. The handler must know the proper method to perform the procedure—without proper training and method education, there is a risk of causing severe pain and suffering instead of death. The duration of consciousness and the level of suffering experienced by an animal after the procedure are difficult to determine, which may contribute to its declining use and replacement by other euthanasia methods, including inhalational agents.

=== Intracardiac or intraperitoneal injection ===
When intravenous injection is not possible, euthanasia drugs such as pentobarbital can be injected directly into a heart chamber or body cavity. Concerning state and federal laws, one of the most humane forms of euthanizing animals is through the injection of sodium pentobarbital. This is typically the second shot that is administered after a sedative when euthanizing animals.

Intraperitoneal (IP) injection is the injection of a substance into the abdominal cavity, and may take up to 15 minutes to take effect in dogs and cats. While IP injections are fully acceptable, an intracardiac (IC) injection may only be performed on an unconscious or deeply sedated animal. Performing IC injections on a fully conscious animal in places with humane laws for animal handling is often a criminal offense.

=== Shooting ===
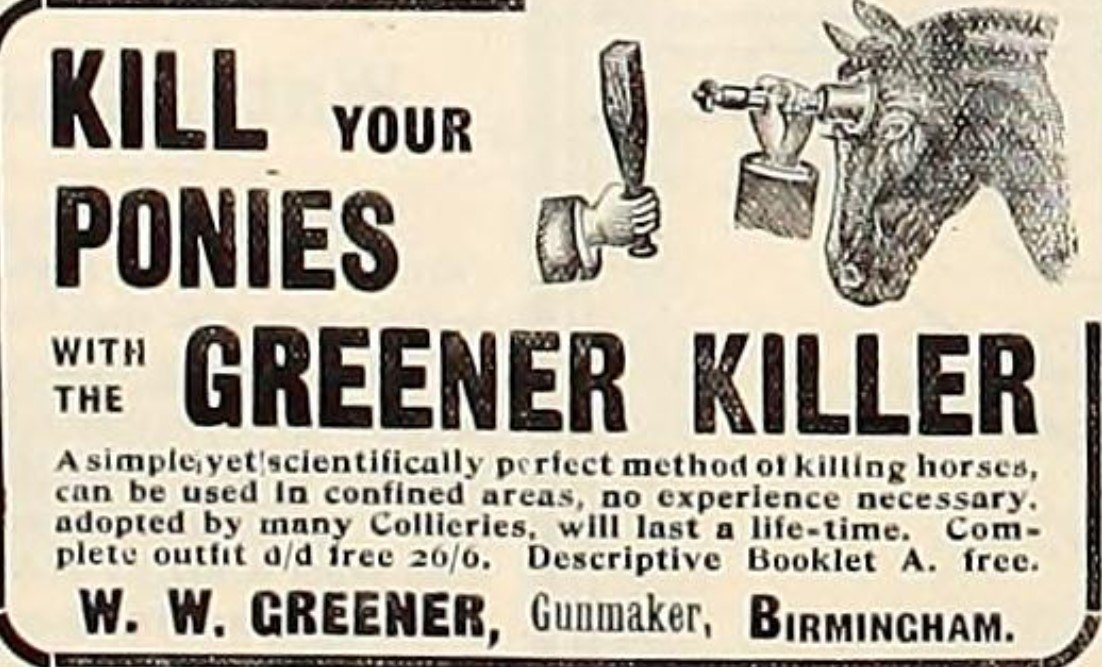
1912 press advertisement for "The Greener Killer", a firearm for euthanizing ponies and horses

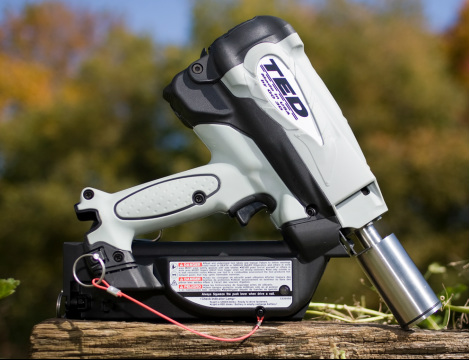
Captive bolt gun

This can be a means of euthanasia for large animals—such as horses, cattle, and deer—if performed properly. This may be performed by means of:

Firearms
Traditionally used in the field for euthanizing horses, deer, or other large game animals. The animal is shot in the forehead with the bullet directed down the spine through the medulla oblongata, resulting in instant death. The risks are minimal if carried out by skilled personnel in a suitable location.

Captive bolt gun
Commonly used by the meat packing industry to slaughter cattle and other livestock. The bolt is fired through the forehead, causing massive disruption of the cerebral cortex. In cattle, this stuns the animal, though if left for a prolonged period, it will die from cerebral edema. Personnel must then rapidly bring about death through pithing or exsanguination. Horses are killed outright by the captive bolt, making pithing and exsanguination unnecessary.

== Reasons ==
The reasons for euthanasia of pets and other animals include:

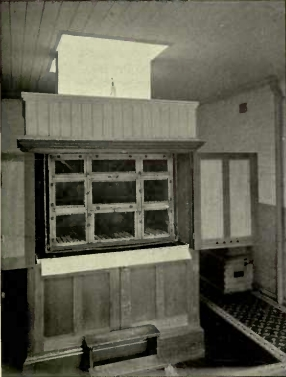
Lethal chamber in the Royal London Institute and Home for Lost and Starving Cats

- Terminal illness, e.g., cancer or rabies
- Illness or accident that is not terminal but would cause suffering for the animal to live with, or when the owner cannot afford the treatment, has a moral objection to the treatment, or is in an area too remote to receive treatment
- Old age and deterioration leading to loss of major bodily functions, resulting in severe impairment of the quality of life
- Dementia in pets leading to loss of cognitive function and normal daily behavior including interactions with the owner. Dementia resulting in unsocial and repetitive behavior causes prolonged stress for both pets and their owners
- Behavioral problems (usually ones that cannot be corrected), e.g., aggression – canines that have caused grievous bodily harm (severe injuries or death) to either humans or other animals through mauling are usually seized and euthanized.
- Lack of a home, caretaker, or resources for feeding
- "Convenience euthanasia", if the owner no longer wants to care for the pet
- Research and testing – In the course of scientific research or testing, animals may be euthanized to be dissected, to prevent suffering after testing, to prevent the spread of disease, or for other reasons

Small animal euthanasia is typically performed in a veterinary clinic or hospital, at an animal shelter, or at the pet owner's home. It is usually carried out by a veterinarian or a veterinary technician working under the veterinarian's supervision. Often, animal shelter workers are trained to perform euthanasia as well. A licensed veterinarian can help an owner determine when, in the course of an illness or behavioral problem, euthanasia is appropriate. Large animals with severe injuries are often euthanized at the site of the accident.

Some animal rights organizations support animal euthanasia in certain circumstances and practice euthanasia at shelters that they operate.

== Legal status ==
In the United States, for companion animals euthanized in animal shelters, most states prescribe intravenous injection as the required method. These laws date to 1990, when Georgia's Humane Euthanasia Act became the first state law to mandate this method. Before that, gas chambers and other methods were commonly used. The Georgia law was resisted by the Georgia Commissioner of Agriculture, Tommy Irvin, who was charged with enforcing the act. In March 2007, he was sued by former State Representative Chesley V. Morton, who wrote the law, and was subsequently ordered by the court to enforce all provisions of the Act.

Some states allow the use of carbon monoxide chambers for euthanasia.

In the Philippines, the treatment and handling of stray dogs are governed by specific laws that emphasize animal welfare. The primary law is Republic Act No. 8485, also known as the "Animal Welfare Act of 1998", as amended by Republic Act No. 10631 in 2013. This law outlines the responsibilities of local government units (LGUs) and veterinarians in dealing with stray animals.

== Remains ==
Many pet owners choose to have their pets cremated or buried after the pet is euthanized. There are pet funeral homes that specialize in animal burial or cremation. Otherwise, the animal facility will often freeze the body and subsequently send it to the local landfill.

In some instances, animals euthanized at shelters or animal control agencies have been sent to meat rendering facilities to be processed for use in cosmetics, fertilizer, gelatin, poultry feed, pharmaceuticals and pet food. It was proposed that the presence of pentobarbital in dog food may have caused dogs to become less responsive to the drug when being euthanized. However, a 2002 FDA study found no dog or cat DNA in the foods they tested, so it was theorized that the drug found in dog food came from euthanized cattle and horses. Furthermore, the drug level found in pet food was safe.

== See also ==
- Animal loss
- Animal slaughter
- Animal chaplains
- Animal welfare
- British Pet Massacre
- Chick culling
- Coup de grâce
- Dysthanasia (animal)
- Insect euthanasia
- Overpopulation in companion animals
- Rainbow Bridge (pets)
