= PCSB =

PCSB may refer to:

== Education ==
- The District of Columbia Public Charter School Board of the District of Columbia
- The Pinellas County School Board of Pinellas County Schools
- Postgraduate Certificate In Sustainable Business, a degree offered by the Cambridge Institute for Sustainability Leadership

== Financial institutions ==
- PCSB Bank, a local bank in New York
