= Berkshire Bank =

Bank in Massachusetts

- Type: Subsidiary
- Industry: Banking
- Founded: February 6, 1846; 180 years ago in Pittsfield, Massachusetts
- Headquarters: Boston, Massachusetts, United States
- Number of locations: 83 branches
- Key people: Nitin J. Mhatre, CEO; Sean A. Gray, president and COO; Brett Brbovic, CFO
- Revenue: ▲US$469.24 million (2018)
- Operating income: ▲US$133.41 million (2018)
- Net income: ▲US$105.77 million (2018)
- Total assets: ▲US$12.212 billion (2018)
- Total equity: ▲US$1.553 billion (2018)
- Number of employees: 1,917 (2018)
- Parent: Berkshire Hills Bancorp
- Divisions: Commerce Bank & Trust Company
- Website: berkshirebank.com

Berkshire Bank was an American bank based in Boston, Massachusetts that operated branches in New England, and New York; it was the third largest regional bank headquartered in Massachusetts. After a merger with Brookline Bancorp, the new entity is called Beacon Bank.

== History ==
The company was founded on February 6, 1846, as Berkshire County Savings Bank. In 1997, a year before James A. Cunningham Jr. was named president and CEO, the bank acquired Great Barrington Savings Bank and changed its name to Berkshire Bank.

It later acquired Woronoco Savings Bank (2005), Factory Point National Bank (2007), Rome Savings Bank and Legacy Banks (2011), Connecticut Bank & Trust Company and Beacon Federal Bank (2012), Hampden Bank (2015) and First Choice Bank (2016).

In November 2017, the year it acquired Commerce Bank & Trust Company, the firm signed a lease for a new headquarters at 60 State Street in Government Center, Boston. On November 26, 2018, Richard Marotta became chairman and CEO of Berkshire Hills Bancorp after Michael Daly resigned from those roles.

On August 20, 2020, a year after SI Financial Group was acquired by the bank, Marotta resigned as CEO of Berkshire Hills Bancorp, whose chairman, Sean Gray, took over the role.

On January 25, 2021, the board of directors announced that Nitin J. Mhatre had been appointed CEO, effective January 29. It was also announced that Gray, who had been serving as acting CEO, would continue to serve as president and COO of the bank.

On September 1, 2025, Berkshire Hills Bancorp, the bank holding company parent of Berkshire Bank, merged with Brookline Bancorp, the holding parent of Brookline Bank, Bank Rhode Island, and PCSB Bank (which serves the lower Hudson Valley in New York state). The new Beacon Financial Corporation is traded on the NYSE under the symbol "BBT"; the individual banks are expected to be rebranded "Beacon Bank" and customer service systems combined in early 2026.
