= Republic First Bancorp =

American Bank

Republic First Bancorp, Inc.
- Type: Public
- Traded as: Expert Market: FRBKQ; Nasdaq: FRBK (1988–2023)
- Industry: Retail banking
- Founded: 1988; 38 years ago
- Defunct: April 26, 2024; 2 years ago
- Fate: Failed
- Successors: Fulton Bank (acquisition of most Republic First Bancorp assets)
- Headquarters: Philadelphia, Pennsylvania, U.S.
- Key people: Vernon Hill (chairman)
- Website: myrepublicbank.com

Republic First Bancorp, Inc., doing business as Republic Bank, was a Philadelphia-based bank from 1988 to 2024.

== History ==
In 2008, the bank shifted from commercial banking to retail banking. In 2016, the bank named Commerce Bank founder Vernon Hill as chairman. In 2016, Republic Bank operated 20 locations in Pennsylvania and New Jersey.

== Receivership ==
On April 26, 2024, U.S. regulators seized Republic First Bancorp after business hours and agreed to sell it to Fulton Bank. The bank was seized by the Pennsylvania Department of Banking and Securities after failed funding talks with a group of investors. The FDIC, appointed as a receiver, said Fulton Bank, a unit of Fulton Financial Corp., will assume substantially all deposits and purchase all the assets of Republic Bank to "protect depositors".

On September 5, 2024, Republic First Bancorp filed for Chapter 11 bankruptcy protection. Republic First Bank itself is not part of the filing since they were sold off before the filing.
