= Hampden Savings Bank =

- U.S. National Register of Historic Places
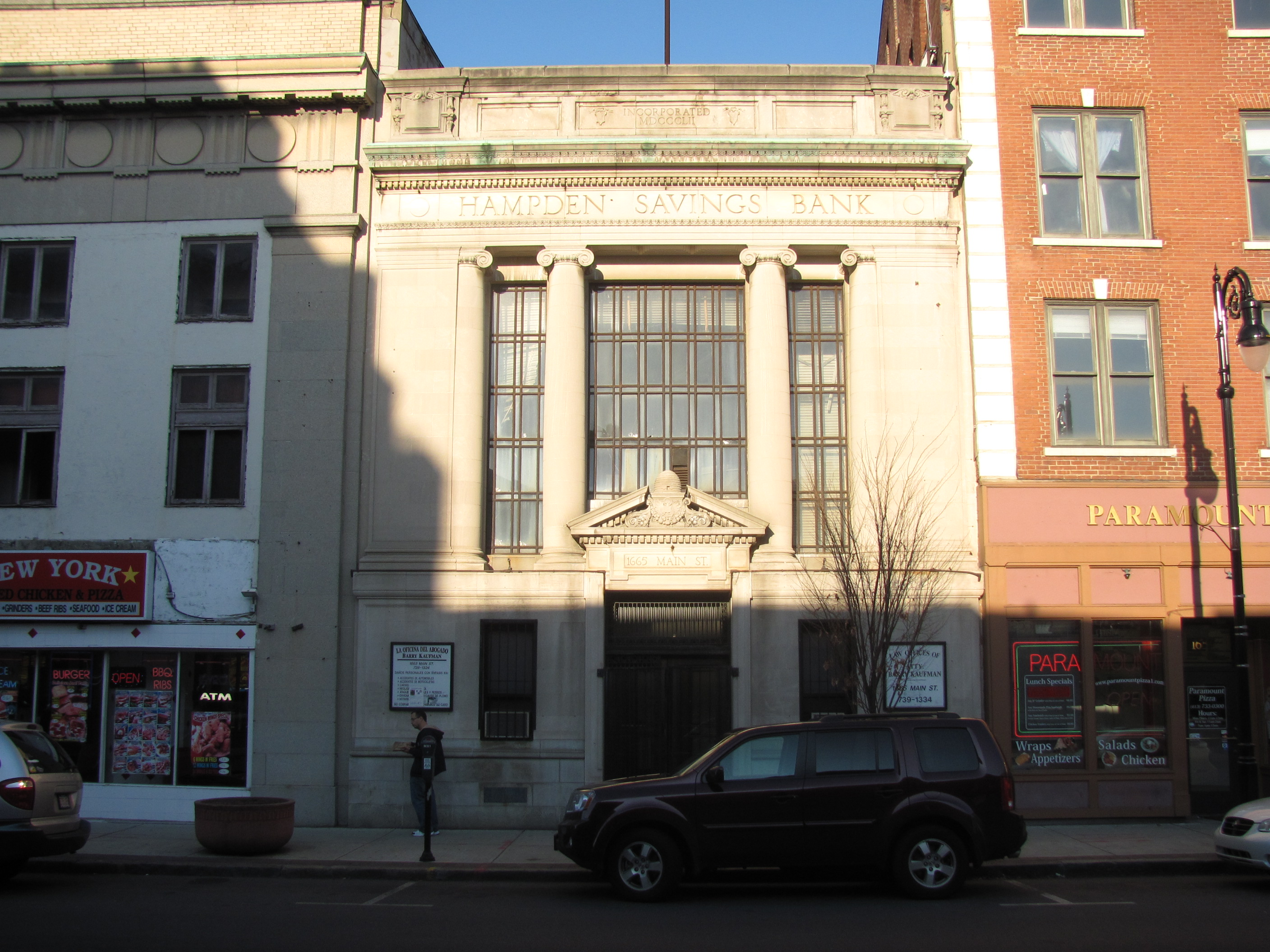
- Hampden Savings Bank

- Location within Massachusetts Location within the United States
- Location: Springfield, Massachusetts
- Coordinates: 42°6′16″N 72°35′40″W
- Built: 1918
- Architect: Max H. Westhoff
- Architectural style: Classical Revival
- MPS: Metro Center, Springfield MRA
- NRHP reference No.: 83000750
- Added to NRHP: February 24, 1983

The Hampden Savings Bank building is a historic bank building at 1665 Main Street in Springfield, Massachusetts. The building's original tenant, Hampden Bank (established 1852), now has a headquarters several blocks south of this site at 19 Harrison Avenue. The Classical Revival building was designed by Max H. Westhoff for the bank in 1918. The building was listed on the National Register of Historic Places in 1983.

== Description and history ==
The Hampden Savings Bank building is located on the east side of Main Street in downtown Springfield, on a block between Taylor and Lyman Streets that is lined with turn-of-the-century commercial buildings. It is a two-story masonry structure, sharing party walls with its neighbors. It has a well-proportioned Classical Revival facade, with a center entrance topped by an elaborate pediment, and tall second-story windows set in a recess with Ionic pilasters at either side. Above this a panel identifies the building, with a cornice and decorative parapet at the top.

Hampden Savings Bank was chartered in 1852 to provide banking services to the growing city's many railroad workers. It shared quarters with another bank, the Agawam Savings Bank, until 1871, and then moved to quarters in a building at Main and Front Streets in 1899. This building was designed by architect Max H. Westhoff (who had recently moved to the area from Saranac, New York) and built for the bank as its first dedicated headquarters in 1918. The bank moved to a new headquarters building at 19 Harrison Avenue in 1952.

== See also ==
- National Register of Historic Places listings in Springfield, Massachusetts
- National Register of Historic Places listings in Hampden County, Massachusetts
