= CoreFirst Bank & Trust =

Bank located primarily in Kansas, U.S.

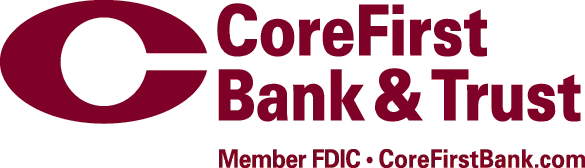
- Type: Private
- Industry: Financial services
- Founded: December 3, 1959; 66 years ago in Topeka, Kansas, U.S.
- Headquarters: Topeka, Kansas, U.S.
- Number of locations: 12 branches
- Area served: Kansas; Colorado
- Key people: Duane Fager, Chairman; Kurt Kuta, President and CEO
- Products: Banking Services
- Total assets: $1.2 billion (2024)
- Number of employees: 275-300 full-time equivalent (2024)
- Parent: Commerce Bank & Trust Holding Company
- Website: www.corefirstbank.com

CoreFirst Bank & Trust (formerly Commerce Bank & Trust) is a community bank headquartered in Topeka, Kansas. Commerce Bank & Trust changed its name to CoreFirst Bank & Trust in order to differentiate itself from other "Commerce Banks", both in Kansas (Commerce Bancshares) and nationwide (such as Commerce Bank & Trust Company). Since the name change, CoreFirst has operated under three different brands.

CoreFirst serves the Kansas communities of Topeka, Lenexa, and Olathe; and the Colorado community of Englewood.

The bank provides personal and commercial account services, including: deposit accounts, installment loans, real estate loans, Visa credit cards, investment management, trust services, lock box, and merchant card services. The bank also offers Internet Banking, Internet Billpayer, E-Statements, Debit & ATM Cards, a network of ATMs with the option of English or Spanish, and an Automated Phone Information System in English and Spanish.

== History ==
CoreFirst Bank & Trust opened December 3, 1959 as Commerce State Bank. Commerce State Bank received trust power and in 1976 changed its name to Commerce Bank & Trust. Commerce opened its first in-store branches (grocery store) in 1988. In 1997, the first location outside of Topeka opened in Emporia, Kansas. Commerce reached $1 billion in assets in 2004.

In July, 2007, Commerce Bank & Trust changed its name to CoreFirst Bank & Trust to allow for expansion outside of its current market; Topeka, Kansas. CoreFirst Bank & Trust assumed the charter of First United Bank, NA Englewood, Colorado. Through this, CoreFirst opened its first location in Englewood, Colorado in September 2007. Later that year, CoreFirst opened its first Kansas City area branch in Shawnee, Kansas. Since 2007, CoreFirst has opened 2 additional locations in the Kansas City, Kansas area. CoreFirst's branch network now consists of 12 branches in Kansas and Colorado.

In 2015, the Federal Reserve Board issues termination of enforcement action in relation to employee stock ownership.
