= Animal loss =

Grief over the loss of an animal

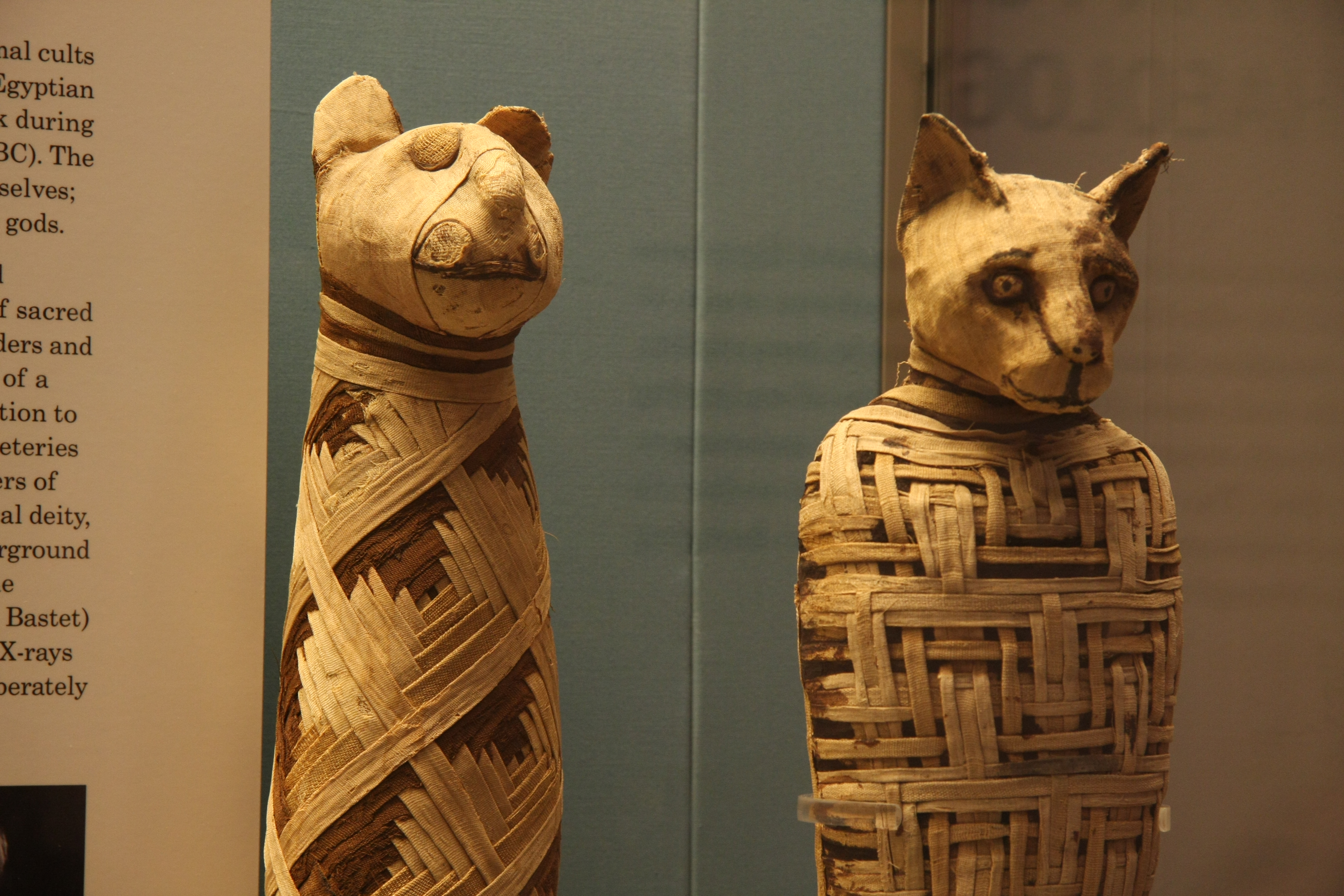
Wealthy Ancient Egyptian families would mummify their treasured pets, believing that the spirit would travel with them to the afterlife.

The loss of a pet or an animal to which one has become emotionally bonded oftentimes results in grief which can be comparable with the death of a human loved one, or even greater, depending on the individual. The death can be felt more intensely when the owner has decided to end the pet's life through euthanasia. While there is strong evidence that animals can feel such loss for other animals, this article focuses on human feelings when an animal is lost, dies, or otherwise is departed.

== Effect of animal loss on humans ==
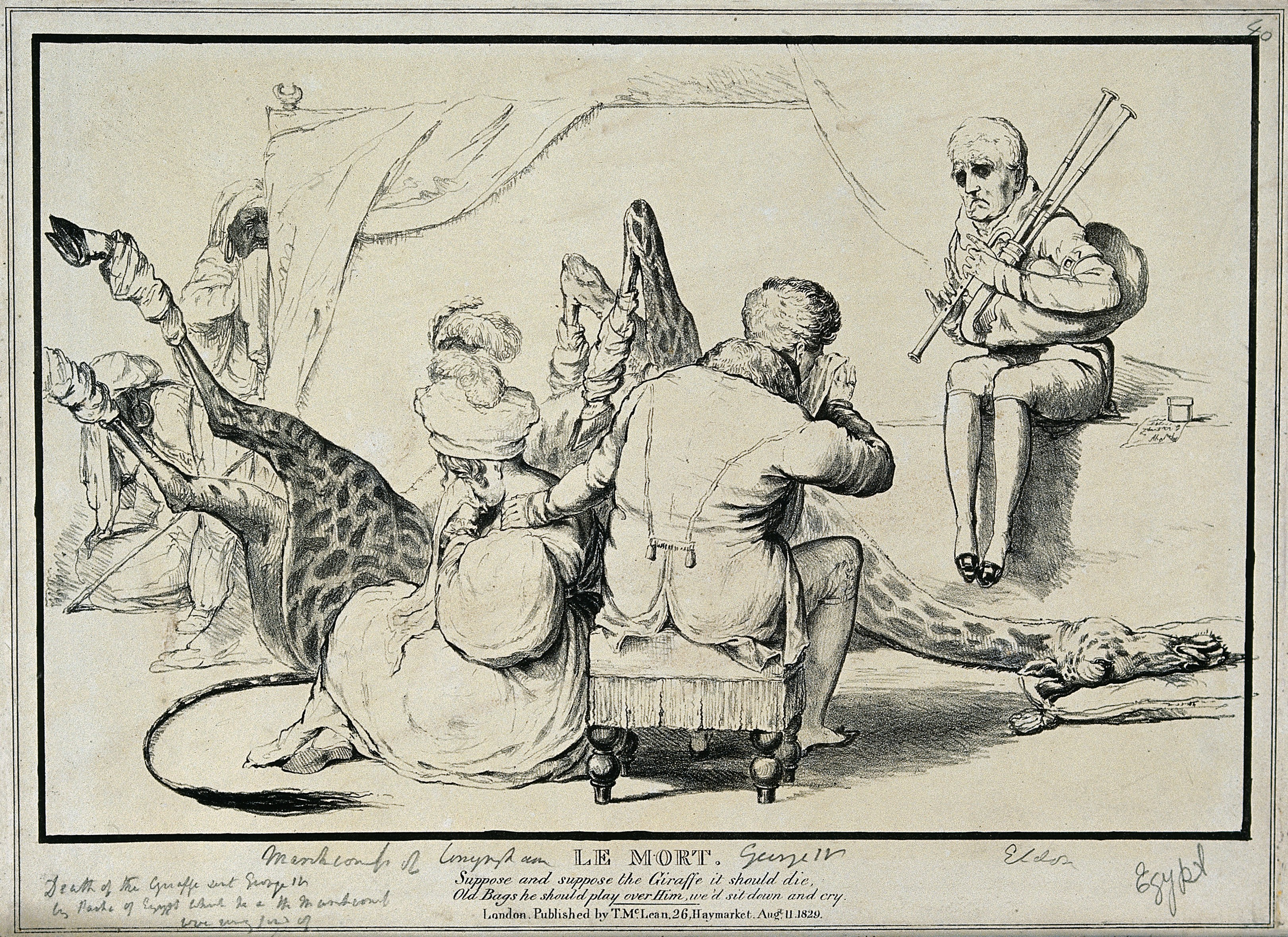
King George IV and the Marchioness of Conyngham grieve over the body of a dead giraffe, which had been sent to them by Mehmet Ali, Pasha of Egypt. Lithograph attributed to J. Doyle, 1829.

There is no set amount of time for the grieving process to occur. However, mourning is much more intense for a pet upon whom the owner was emotionally dependent. Additionally, some pet owners may feel unable to express their grieving due to social customs and norms surrounding pets. If the pet owner internalizes the grief, the suffering increases.

The stages of grief proposed by Elizabeth Kübler-Ross was designed in relation to human death but can be adapted to describe the grief process for the death of a pet. Indeed, pet death includes several lessons: 1) the relationship rather than the object (the animal) is central to understanding the loss; 2) the manner of death/loss will affect the grieving process; 3) the age and living situation of the bereaved will affect the grieving process.

The University of Michigan did a study of grief involving 174 adults who had deceased pets. Participants were administered a modified CENSHARE Pet Attachment Survey. Results indicate that 85.7% of owners initially experienced at least one symptom of grief, but the occurrence decreased to 35.1% at six months and 22.4% at one year. Males and females reported different rates on six of the 12 symptoms surveyed. The severity and length of symptoms were significantly correlated with the degree of attachment to the deceased pet. These findings indicate that pet loss can be a potential clinical concern, especially if the person's attachment to the pet is strong.

=== Seeking Support and Moving Forward ===
Grieving a pet is a deeply personal experience, and healing takes time. Some people find comfort in joining pet lover support groups, while others turn to professional grief counseling. Additionally, volunteering at an animal shelter or fostering a pet in need can help transform grief into a positive action, ensuring that a pet's love continues to inspire even after they are gone.

=== Coping with death ===
Though well-meaning phrases like "time heals all wounds" can upset the grieving pet owner, the one factor required for all coping strategies is indeed time. Coping also involves understanding the emotions surrounding the loss of a pet, and then accepting the emotions to focus towards positive solutions.

Coping strategies may include:

- Going through the grieving process
- Strengthening positive memories
- Seeking support from resources, organizations, and individuals
- Seeking solace from one's own spiritual beliefs
- Preparing for a pet's death in advance

Pet owners may also seek to memorialize their pets by placing their remains in a cremation urn or jewelry. Other traditions include erecting stone memorials or other commemorative plaques for deceased pets, or by nicknaming objects like stars after them. Additionally, a 2020 report found that 19% of Americans wanted to be buried with their pet's remains after passing.

=== Types of loss ===
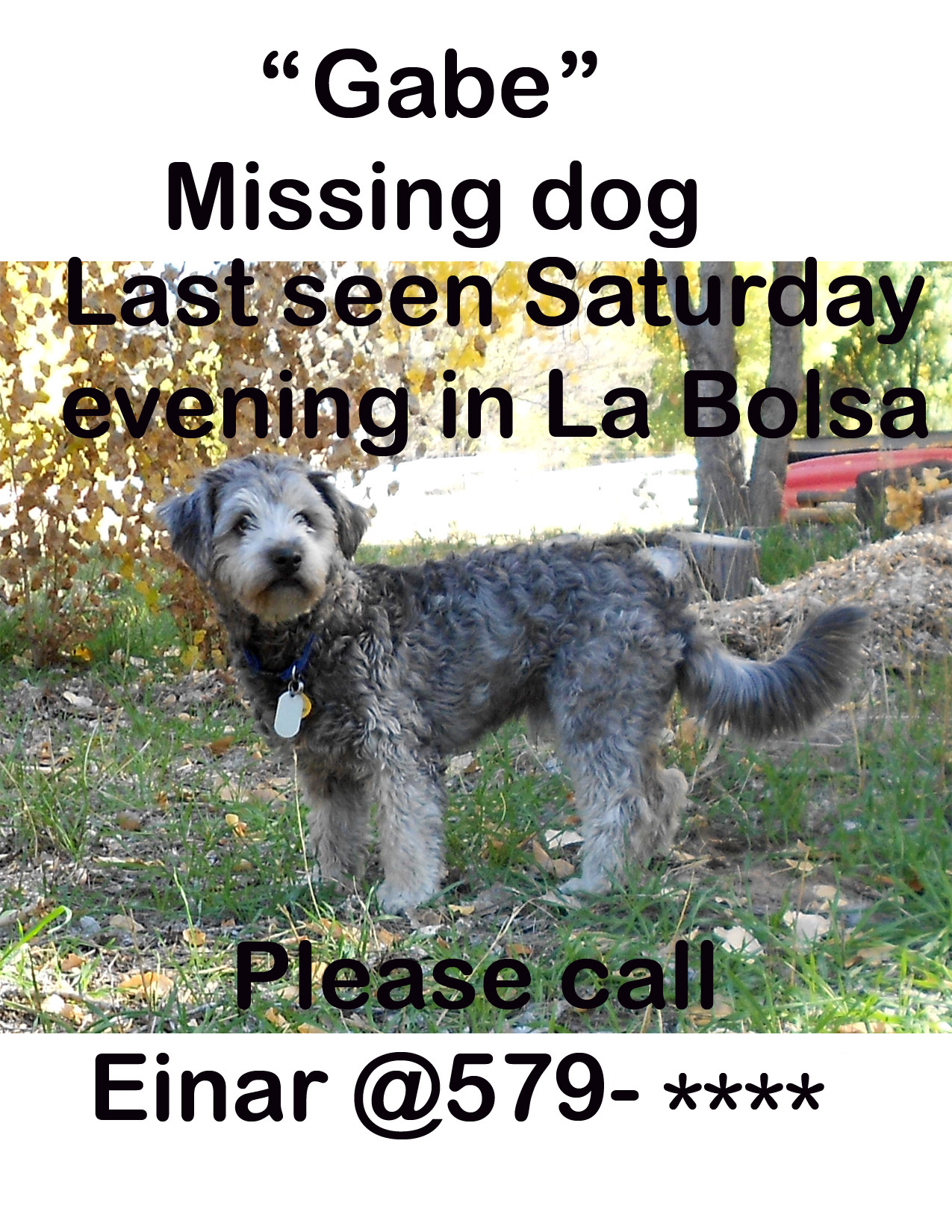
Typical posting for a lost pet

There are several particular types of loss:

- Pet is missing (considered an unresolved loss)
- Pet is lost through divorce/separation
- Pet is accidentally injured or killed
- Pet is willfully injured or killed
- Pet is stolen
- Pet dies naturally
- Pet is euthanized
- Pet becomes very ill

=== Getting a new animal ===
Before bringing a new pet into the home following the death of a previous pet, some advise people to consider the timing carefully. Additionally, it is recommended to consider where the bereaved are in the grieving process, and to choose the new pet for its own unique qualities rather than trying to replace the former pet.

=== Workplace issues ===
Pet illness and death are gradually becoming recognized as similar to other forms of sickness and death in the family. In the U.K., a variety of companies provide paid leave for such eventualities, with employment tribunals backing this in some instances in which employment terms did not specifically mention pet loss.

Recent studies by insurers suggest that up to one in four pet owners are sufficiently affected by pet loss or illness to take time off, but many feel this will be treated lightly and, hence, state they were sick. According to Petplan, 35% of people admitted to taking time off work to settle new pets into the home or care for sick pets, and half admitted to taking a whole week off. According to Direct Line, one in four pet owners, "said they have been too upset to go into the workplace when their four legged friend died" and, "many of those who did go into work after the death of their pet said they were unproductive." The latter survey also noted that pet owners in the U.K. take "around 8 days off" due to grief at the death of a pet and that "seventy-nine percent of people responding to the survey admitted they did not think their boss would be sympathetic, and the only way they could get time off work was by... pretending to be ill."

== Pet loss resources ==
Resources for pet loss change regularly but include grief counseling, support groups, online forums, hotlines, and books. The Pet Loss Support Page maintains an updated list of recommended resources.

Resources include:

- Hotlines: Several veterinary schools and nonprofit agencies in the United States have pet loss support hotlines.
- Online forums: Internet search engines using "pet loss support" as a search term will locate several online forums for grieving pet owners. Also, there are digital memorial websites for pets. The online community allows one to create a profile, compiling images, details, and memories of the lost pet in one place.
- Books: Books on pet loss are published regularly.
- Grief Counseling: Therapists with grief therapy training can be found in local communities. In addition, therapists may also include support groups that meet regularly to discuss issues surrounding pet loss.
- Hospices: Some animal hospices offer grief support.
- Websites: Organizations may have webpages with various resources for grieving pet owners

== Beliefs about non-human death ==
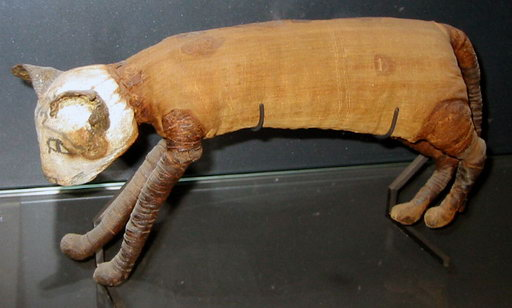
A mummified cat

Some world religions have held that beloved pets will join their families in an afterlife. Animal worship was common in the ancient world, influencing the burial practices of animals. Animal mummification was practiced in ancient Egypt and gave special significance to cats in some areas. Egyptians believed that mummification was imperative in order to gain admittance to the afterlife, ensuring the animals' immortality.

Some ancient Egyptian families believed mummified pets would keep the deceased company in the afterlife. The most common Egyptian pets included cats, dogs, mongooses, monkeys, gazelles, and birds. Many Egyptians loved their pets, and, according to the Greek observer Herodotus, the customary process of mourning the loss of a loved pet included crying and shaving one's eyebrows. Ancient Egyptian pets were given names like humans name pets today, evidenced by over 70 names deciphered in inscriptions identifying mummified pet dog remains.

Modern religions are divided as to whether non-human animals have souls, the ability to reincarnate, or existence in the afterlife.

In the absence of a common religious belief, many pet owners have embraced the concept of the Rainbow Bridge. The origin of which is not clearly known, speaks of a metaphorical or mythical place of reunion where deceased pets live in a paradisical version of limbo, rejuvenated and free of pain and suffering until their human companions arrive upon their own deaths. At this point, the pet(s) run to their human companions and they enter Heaven together never to be parted again.

A number of deathbed visions and dreams involve sightings of deceased pets; hence, some link these reports with the existence of animal souls. Such experiences may be effective in easing one's grief.

In Mormonism, all organisms (as well as the entire planet Earth) are believed to have a spirit, but that beings without the gift of free agency—the ability to know and choose between right and wrong—are innocent, unblemished spirits who go straight to Heaven when they die. According to Mormon beliefs, animals will be resurrected along with humans at the end of days.

Animal chaplains are becoming increasingly popular for helping bereaved family members deal with the loss of their pet by providing memorial services, spiritual reassurance, and grief counseling.

== See also ==
- Death and culture
- Pet cemetery
- Pet psychic
- Pet humanization
