= Fulton Financial Corporation =

Regional financial services company

- Type: Public
- Traded as: Nasdaq: FULT; S&P 600 Component
- Industry: Finance
- Founded: 1882; 144 years ago
- Headquarters: Lancaster, Pennsylvania, US
- Key people: Curtis J. Myers Chairman (president and CEO)
- Products: Banking
- Revenue: ▲US$ 1.091 billion (2022)
- Net income: ▲US$ 286.981 million (2022)
- Total assets: ▲US$ 20.037 billion (2017)
- Total equity: ▲US$ 2.23 billion (2017)
- Number of employees: 3,500 (2017)
- Website: fultonbank.com

Fulton Financial Corporation is an American regional financial services holding company, headquartered in Lancaster, Pennsylvania.

Fulton Financial Corp. has over $30 billion in assets and operates as Fulton Bank. It has over 200 banking centers that provide financial services throughout Pennsylvania, Maryland, Delaware, New Jersey, New York (until September 2024) and Virginia.

The company engages in five main businesses: Branch Banking, Consumer lending, Commercial Banking, Investment Advisors and Mortgage Services.

== Subsidiaries ==
Banking:

- Fulton Bank

Financial services and brokerage:

- Fulton Financial Advisors, N.A.

Wealth management:

- Fulton Private Bank

Commercial and Small Business Solutions:

- Fulton Bank
- commercial banking
- Republic First Bancorp

== Mergers and acquisitions ==
In fall 2019, Fulton Bank completed its consolidation of The Columbia Bank in Howard County, Maryland. Fulton stated that customers of The Columbia Bank should see minimal changes, other than the bank name.

In 2022, FFC purchased Prudential Bancorp, Inc., (Nasdaq:PBIP) on July 1, and the acquiree's primary subsidiary, Prudential Bank, was merged into Fulton Bank on November 5. Oddly unaffiliated with either PBIP or FFC, a "Prudential Bank" continues to operate in the United Arab Emirates; during operation, Prudential Bank was regional, headquartered in Philadelphia, and had no affiliation with Prudential Financial.

On April 26, 2024, the FDIC seized Philadelphia based Republic Bank and transferred almost all $6 Billion of assets to Fulton Bank, doubling its presence in the Philadelphia metropolitan area.

On November 25, 2025 Fulton Bank Announced the intention to acquire the $2.5 Billion Asset Blue Foundry Bancorp based in Rutherford, New Jersey. The deal is expected to close in Q2, 2026 and will further expand the bank in Northern New Jersey.

== Complaints ==
According to a United States government consumer finance database, the Consumer Financial Protection Bureau (CFPB) has received 64 complaints related to Fulton Financial since May 1, 2017. The complaint subjects include:

- Transaction was not authorized
- Fee problem
- Trouble during payment process
- Problem accessing account
- Funds not received from closed account
- Funds not handled or disbursed as instructed
- Fees charged for closing account
- Money was not available when promised
- Charged too much interest
