= Cornhill Insurance =

English insurance company

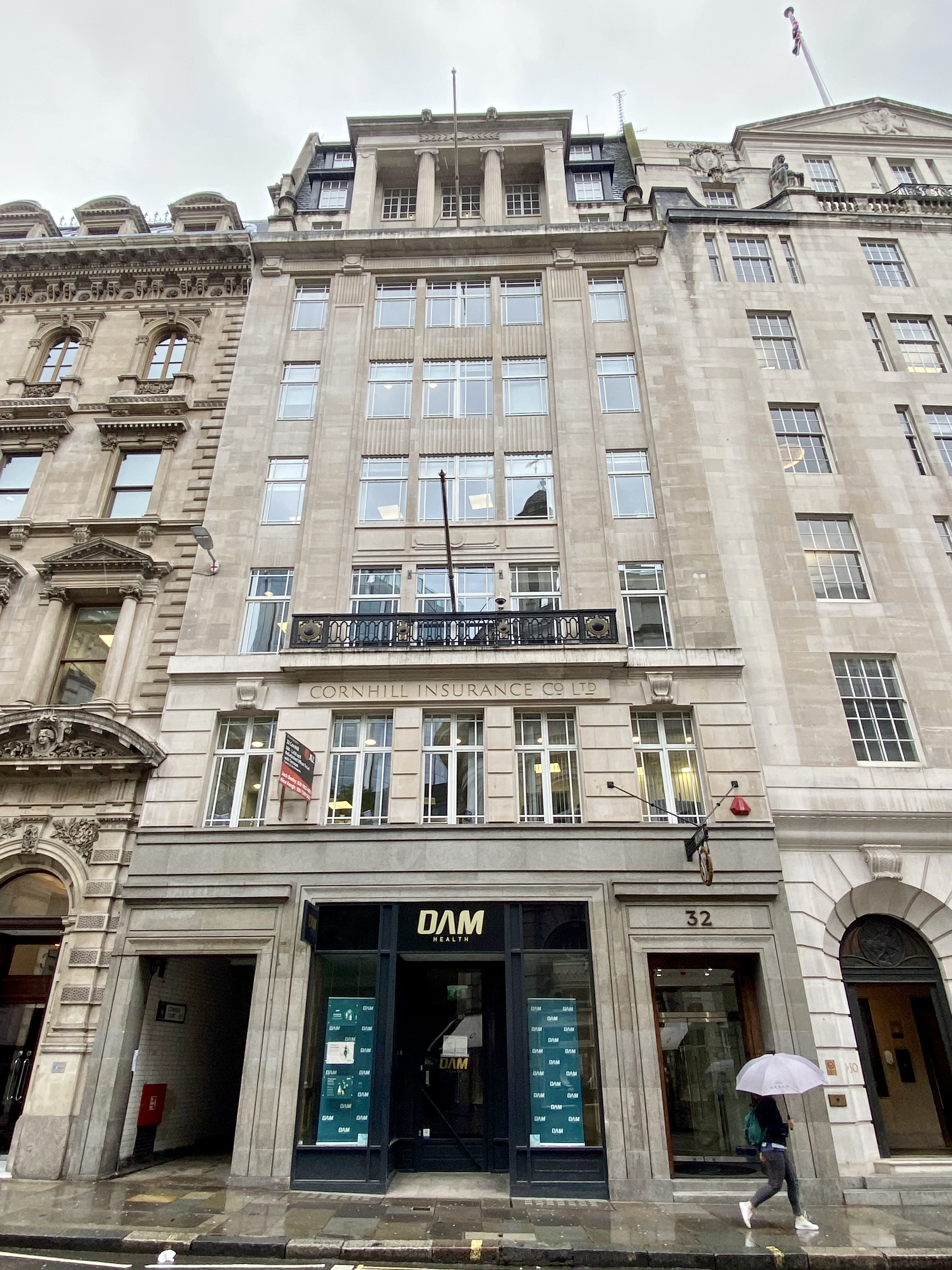
- The company's head office at 32, Cornhill
- Industry: Insurance
- Founded: 1905; 121 years ago
- Defunct: 2007
- Fate: Acquired by Allianz
- Headquarters: London, England

Cornhill Insurance was a major British insurance company based in London, England.

== History ==
The company was founded by the directors of Willis Faber as a fire insurance company in 1905. It moved to new offices at 32, Cornhill in London in the mid-1930s. The offices were designed by Gunton & Gunton in the neoclassical style, built in ashlar stone and completed in 1935. A pair of doors for the building were sculpted in clay by Walter Gilbert and then carved in mahogany by B. P. Arnold at H. H. Martyn & Co.

Thomas Tilling acquired a majority interest in the company in 1943. The company became a major sponsor of test cricket, thereby significant increasing brand awareness, in 1978. After Tilling Group was acquired by BTR in 1983, Cornhill Insurance was marketed for sale: it was acquired by Allianz in 1986. Cornhill Insurance went on to acquire the British Reserve Insurance Company in 1987, Petplan in May 1996 and DBI Insurance in August 1999.

Allianz decided to retire the brand in the early 21st century. It ceased sponsoring test cricket in 2001 and, after its closed life fund was sold to Britannic Assurance in December 2004, the remaining business was rebranded as Allianz Insurance in April 2007.
