= RateSetter =

British peer-to-peer lending company

Retail Money Market Ltd
- Trade name: RateSetter
- Founded: 2009
- Founder: Rhydian Lewis, Peter Behrens
- Fate: Acquired in UK by Metro Bank, September 2020, listed on ASX in Australia
- Headquarters: London
- Area served: UK, Australia
- Products: Financial services
- Parent: Metro Bank
- Website: www.ratesetter.com

RateSetter was a London-based peer-to-peer lending company founded in 2009. It traded in the UK and, from 2014, in Australia until 2020, when the UK business was acquired by Metro Bank for £35m, and the Australian business listed on ASX for a value of £110m.

RateSetter was one of the first companies active in the private credit industry, and introduced services such as a provision fund which mutualised risk to lower the cost of accessing loans. Multiple billions were lent via the platform between over 750,000 investors and consumer and business borrowers.

== History ==
RateSetter's holding company, Retail Money Market Ltd, was incorporated in October 2009 by Rhydian Lewis, an investment banker from Lazard, and he was joined by co-founder Peter Behrens, a lawyer turned banker formerly of Royal Bank of Scotland. The private limited company was funded initially by angel investors.

In July 2014, it was announced that the British Business Bank would begin lending through RateSetter to support borrowing for business purposes.. RateSetter also had other institutional lenders, although its focus was always on retail investors.

RateSetter lobbied the government to regulate peer-to-peer lending, which eventuated in 2017 with the first set of regulations. The regulatory framework enabled the launch of the Innovative finance ISA which took place in 2018. Peer-to-peer lending was in effect one of the first new regulated financial products for some time.

RateSetter ended 2014 as the largest P2P lender in the UK by volume (the other major players being Funding Circle, Zopa and LendInvest). In spring 2015, RateSetter attracted investment from UK fund managers and a global family office. Later that year, RateSetter moved to offices in the City of London on Bishopsgate, London.

In 2017, City heavyweight Paul Manduca became chairman of RateSetter; he was at the time also chairman of FTSE-100 Prudential plc. RateSetter also raised further equity investment from shareholders, valuing the business at over £200m. Rhydian Lewis was appointed OBE in the 2017 Birthday Honours.

With its continued focus on the retail investor, RateSetter became the largest provider of the Innovative Finance ISA. The business was growing and preparing for a potential IPO in the UK. RateSetter's investors were earning a premium to bank savings rates, while its loans were some of the most competitive on the market.

RateSetter was planning a pre-IPO equity raise in the first half of 2020. The company had been valued over £200m in its most recent funding round. The company was positive on the regulatory framework that had been put in place in the UK with effect from December 2019, which it believed would be the foundation for the industry maturing after its first decade.

In May 2020, as a contingency for the widespread expectation of increased risk across UK lending due to the COVID-19 pandemic, RateSetter halved the interest rate paid to lenders. Liquidity was also temporarily delayed but had returned by October. Full payment of interest resumed on 28 January 2021.

=== Acquisition by Metro Bank ===
In May 2020, it was announced that RateSetter had been approached by Metro Bank, a British challenger bank. Agreement was reached in August for a total enterprise value of £35m conditional on meeting certain performance criteria. The purchase was subject to regulatory and shareholder approval, and completed on 14 September 2020. The Australian unit was not part of the sale and continued to be owned by its shareholders.

Metro Bank said it intended to continue the RateSetter brand and operations, with new lending funded by the bank's deposits, not through peer-to-peer. The bank went on to use the platform and brand for some of its savings products.

In February 2021, Metro Bank bought out the P2P investors at par, valued at £384m. Some among the 45,000 then investors objected to the inclusion in the transaction of the "provision fund", which had been bolstered by interest diverted from investors in recent months. Metro Bank's focus was on consumer lending and therefore RateSetter's property lending business was sold in 2021 to Shawbrook Bank.

Towards the end of 2023, Metro Bank ceased using the RateSetter brand for savings accounts and new personal loans.

== RateSetter Australia ==
RateSetter Australia commenced operations in November 2014. The Australian business, based in Sydney, is managed and majority-owned locally, and was the first peer-to-peer lending platform in the country open to retail customers.

In December 2017, it was announced that over AU$200m had been lent via the platform. By mid-2020, lending had grown to AU$800m and the company was preparing for a stock exchange flotation.

In 2019, 14% of the company was owned by Retail Money Market Ltd; this holding was not included in the 2020 acquisition of the UK business by Metro Bank.

In August 2020, RateSetter Australia was renamed Plenti ahead of an IPO which took place in September 2020.
