= Hampden Bank =

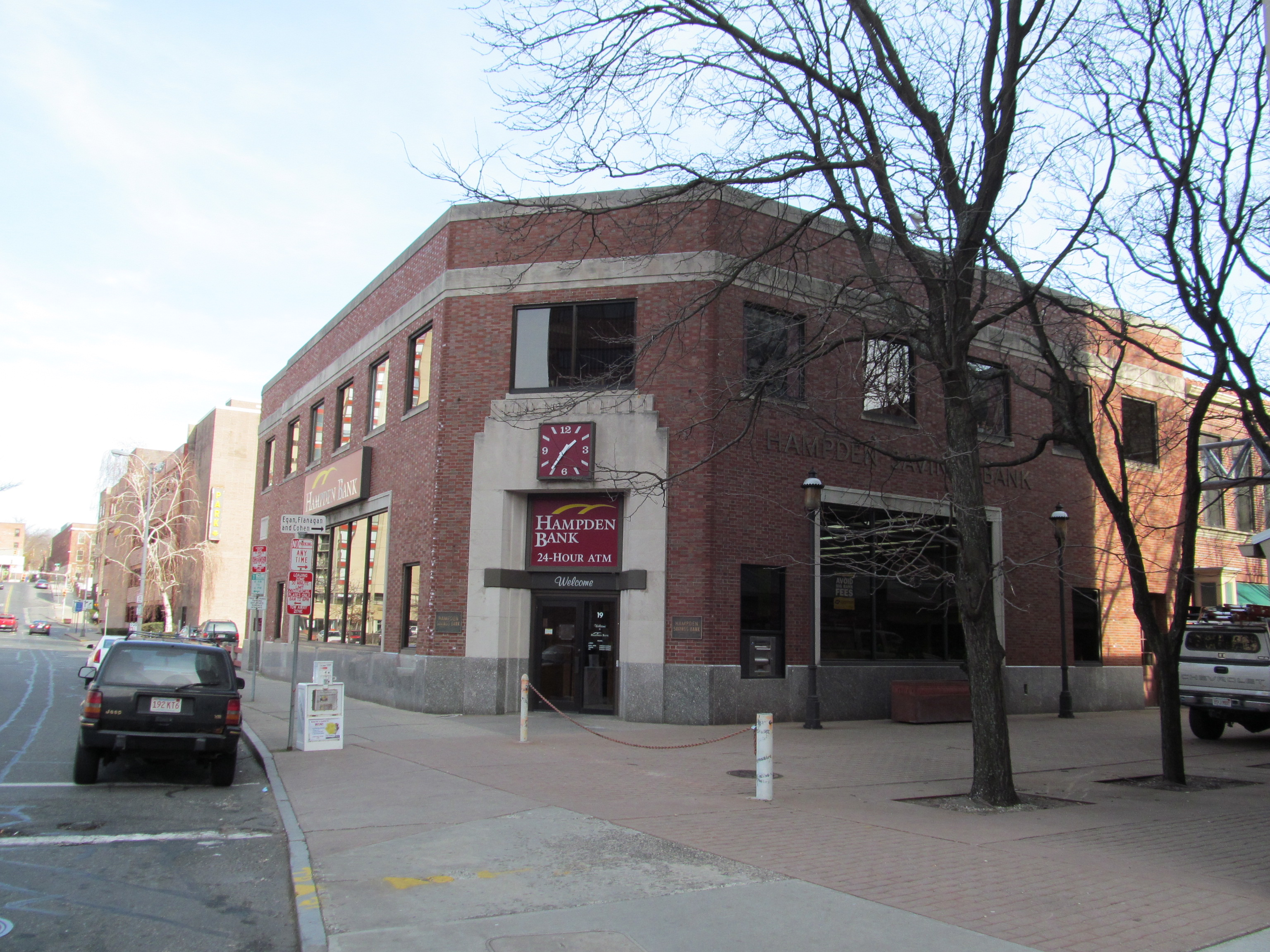
Hampden Bank in Downtown Springfield

Hampden Bank (formerly Hampden Savings Bank) was one of two banks headquartered in Springfield, Massachusetts, (the other - NuVo Bank - was opened in Metro Center in 2009.) Established in 1852, Hampden Bank was a full-service bank that serves people and businesses in Hampden County, Massachusetts, and in surrounding communities. As of 2011, Hampden Bank had ten office locations in Springfield, Agawam, Longmeadow, West Springfield, Wilbraham, at Tower Square in Metro Center Springfield, and in Indian Orchard. In 2015, Hampden Bank was acquired by Pittsfield-based Berkshire Bank.

== History ==
Founded in Springfield, Massachusetts before the American Civil War in 1852, Hampden Bank's roots in Western Massachusetts run deep. Originally chartered to serve railroad employees - one of Hampden Bank's first locations, built-in 1918, is listed on the National Register of Historic Places - and is located two blocks south of Springfield Union Station. (For information on that building, see: Hampden Savings Bank.) As of 2011, Hampden Bank's Main Office is located several blocks south of that location at 19 Harrison Avenue, near the center of the city's Downtown Business District. In 2011, Hampden Bank consisted of ten full-service branches and an extensive network of automated teller machines in Western Massachusetts. It remained a mutual bank until January 18, 2007, when its stock became public.

The Hampden Bank Foundation provides grants to nonprofit, community-based organizations in the Pioneer Valley. Some examples of these institutions are Habitat for Humanity and the Community Music School of Springfield. Hampden Bank also sponsors the annual Hoop City Jazz & Art Festival, which draws tens of thousands of spectators to Springfield's Court Square each July.
