= PCSB Bank =

Local bank in New York

PCSB Financial Corporation
- Type: Public
- Traded as: Nasdaq: PCSB; Russell 2000 Component
- Industry: Banking
- Founded: 1871; 155 years ago in Brewster, New York
- Headquarters: Brewster, New York
- Key people: Joseph D. Roberto (chairman, CEO & president); Scott D. Nogles (CFO)
- Revenue: ▲$0.040 billion (2016)
- Net income: ▼$0.003 billion (2016)
- Total assets: ▲$1.426 billion (2016)
- Total equity: ▲$0.279 billion (2016)
- Number of employees: 184
- Website: pcsb.com

PCSB Bank is a bank based in Yorktown Heights, New York. It is a wholly owned subsidiary of PCSB Financial Corporation, a bank holding company.

It has 15 branches.

== History ==
The bank was established in 1871 in Brewster, New York as the Putnam County Savings Bank.

In April 2015, the bank acquired CMS Bancorp.

In October 2015, the bank changed its name to PCSB Bank.

In April 2017, the company converted itself from a mutual organization to a joint-stock company and became a public company via an initial public offering.

In May 2022, the company was acquired by Brookline Bancorp for $313 Million. On September 1, 2025, Brookline Bancorp merged with Berkshire Hills Bancorp; PCSB Bank is expected to rebrand and merge customer service systems into the combined Beacon Bank in early 2026.
