= Metro Bank (United Kingdom) =

Bank operating in the United Kingdom

Metro Bank plc
- Formerly: Metro Bank Limited (2007–2009)
- Type: Public limited company
- Traded as: LSE: MTRO
- Industry: Banking; Financial services
- Founded: 29 July 2010; 16 years ago
- Founders: Anthony Thomson; Vernon Hill
- Headquarters: London, United Kingdom
- Number of locations: 76
- Key people: Sir Michael Snyder (Chairman); Daniel Frumkin (Chief Executive Officer)
- Products: Credit cards; Consumer banking; Corporate banking
- Revenue: ▲£593.3 million (2025)
- Operating income: ▲£87.2 million (2025)
- Net income: ▲£69.7 million (2025)
- Total assets: ▼£16,475.0 million (2025)
- Total equity: ▲£1,484.0 million (2025)
- Owner: Jaime Gilinski Bacal (53%)
- Website: metrobankonline.co.uk

Metro Bank PLC is a retail and commercial bank operating in the United Kingdom, founded by Anthony Thomson and Vernon Hill in 2010. At its launch it was the first new high street bank to launch in the United Kingdom in over 150 years. It is listed on the London Stock Exchange and is a constituent of the FTSE 250 Index.

After a period of rapid growth, Metro Bank hit difficulties in early 2019 when it announced it had insufficient capital to meet regulatory requirements, following the discovery of an error in the way it categorised its commercial loans for capital adequacy purposes. As a result, it had to raise an additional £350m of capital. Concerns over the announcement and the bank's ability to raise the capital resulted in the bank's share price falling by 75% in less than four months, and large depositors withdrawing cash, because of "adverse sentiment".

== History ==
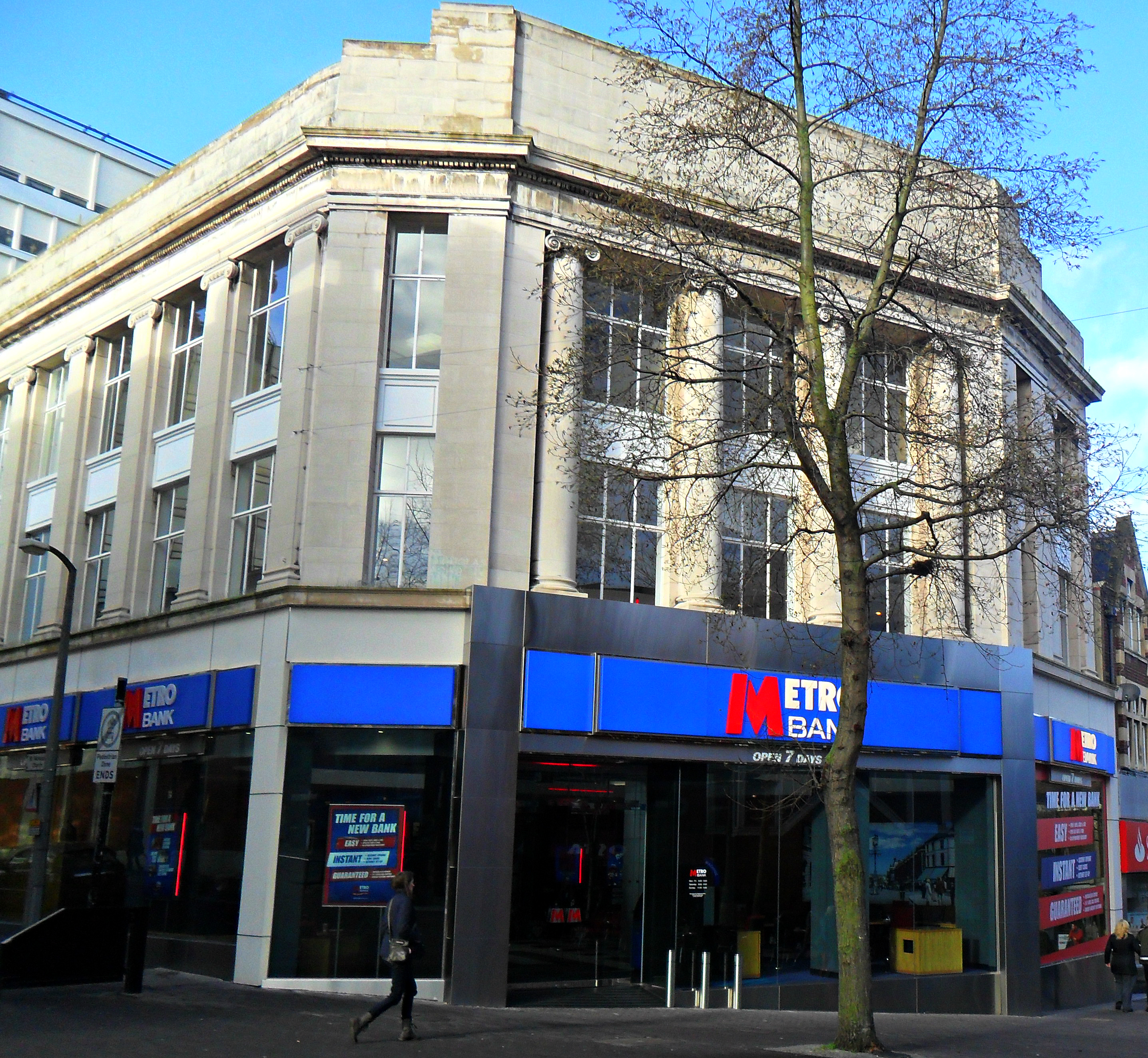

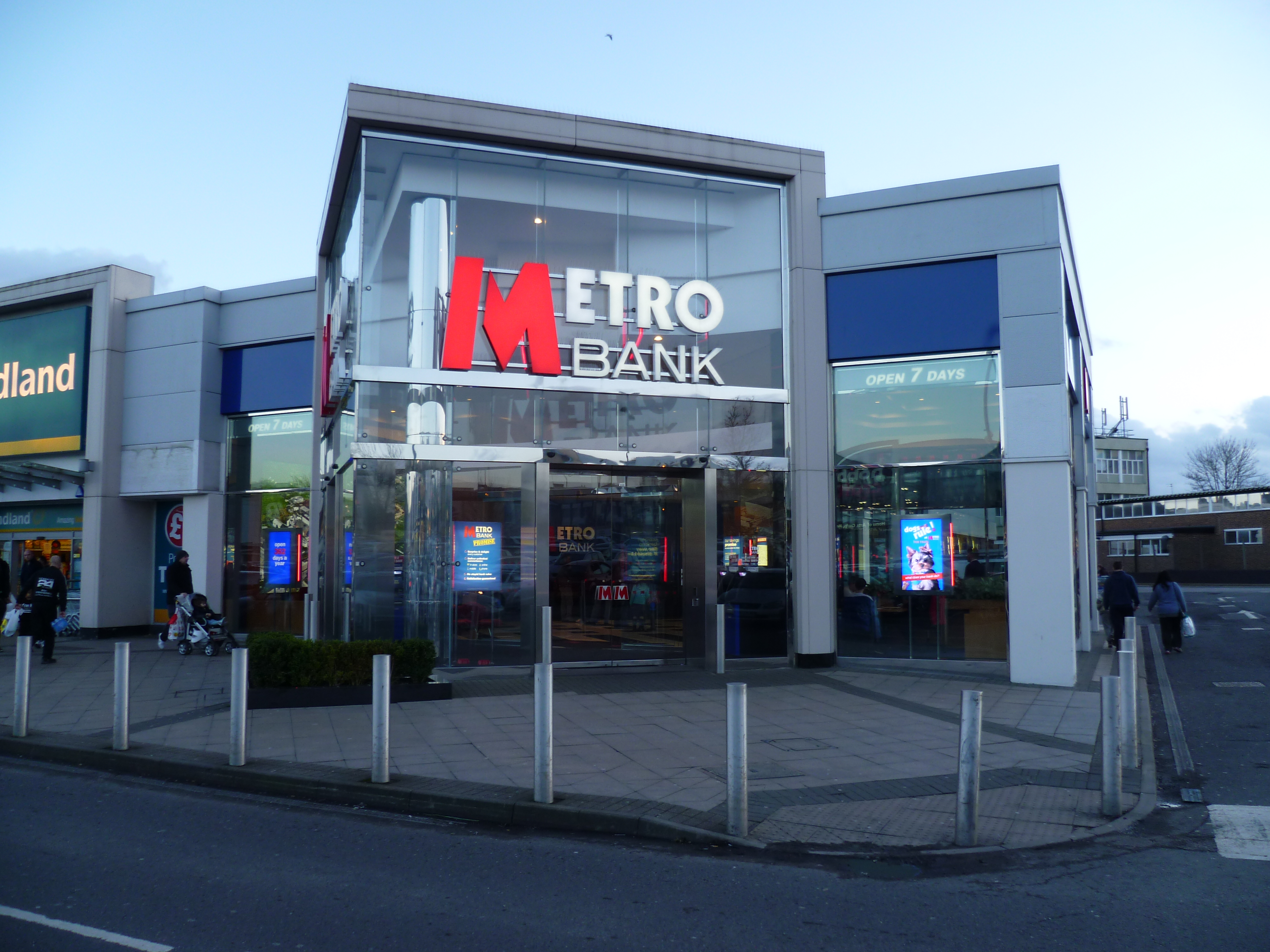
Metro Bank in Sutton, London (top) and Borehamwood (bottom)

Metro Bank was founded by Anthony Thomson and Vernon Hill and granted its licence by the Financial Services Authority on 5 March 2010, the first high-street bank to be granted such a licence for over 150 years. It planned to open between 200 and 250 branches in Greater London within ten years of starting up. Its first branch opened on 29 July 2010 in Holborn, central London.

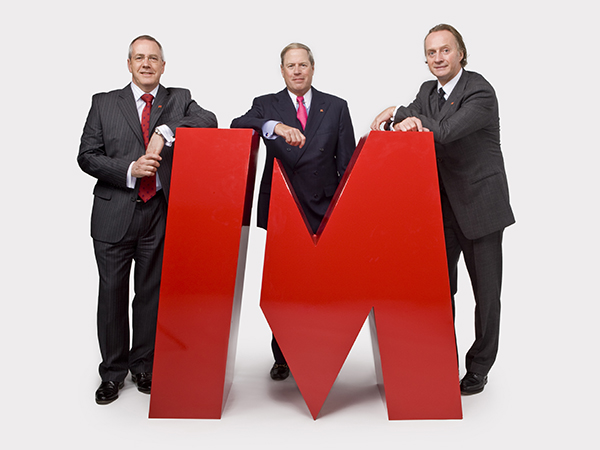
Ben Gunn, Vernon Hill, Anthony Thompson in 2008

In 2012, the bank raised an additional $200 million in funding from investors including Fidelity, Steven A. Cohen of hedge fund SAC Capital Advisors, and New York real estate investors the LeFraks and David and Simon Reubens. In the same year, Forbes magazine reported that Metro's flagship Holborn branch had "...garnered $200 million in deposits, four times the total at the average mature American branch".

On 2 May 2013 the Daily Telegraph reported that, following a loss of £8.8 million in the first quarter of 2013, Metro Bank's pre-tax losses had exceeded £100 million in less than three years since its launch, but the bank stated that these were planned for, and were "a result of its growth initiatives". In an interview with the Financial Times, Hill said the bank was "...in line with the business plan to rapidly grow this company". He added: "Our primary goal is to expand the business ... and profit certainly will come".

Metro Bank acquired SME Finance in August 2013, and rebranded the business as Metro Bank SME Finance in May 2014.

In January 2019, Metro Bank admitted classifying a portfolio of commercial loans for capital purposes incorrectly, thereby failing to hold sufficient capital to meet regulatory requirements; the error applied to around 10% of its loan book. The miscalculation was identified through a review by the Prudential Regulation Authority (PRA) but Metro Bank erroneously gave the impression that the bank had identified the incorrect classification itself. To correct the error in the capital classification, Metro Bank announced a £350m share issue and said it would reduce its growth plans. It was also reported that the PRA and the Financial Conduct Authority were to investigate the circumstances of the error. In December 2021, the bank was fined £5.38m by the PRA after their investigation, saying that it had "failed to meet the standards of governance and controls expected of it" with regards to the risk weighting and classification of commercial loans.

As a result of the admission and the share issue announcement, Metro Bank's share price fell sharply, losing 40% of its value in the month after the announcement and 75% in less than four months. By March 2019, the BBC reported that Metro Bank shares were the second most shorted shares on the UK stock market. Additionally, large depositors began withdrawing funds: Metro Bank admitted that there had been a 4% drop in its deposits in the first quarter of 2019 because of "adverse sentiment".

It was announced in August 2020 that Metro Bank had agreed to acquire Retail Money Market Ltd, a London-based provider of peer-to-peer loans trading as RateSetter. The price would be between £2.5 million and £12 million, depending on performance over the next three years. The purchase was subject to regulatory approval and the agreement of Retail Money Market Ltd shareholders, and was expected to complete in the fourth quarter of 2020. Metro Bank would continue the RateSetter brand and its operations, but new unsecured personal lending would be funded by the bank's deposits, not through peer-to-peer. In February 2021, Metro Bank bought RateSetter's entire portfolio of loans, valued at £384m.

In February 2021, Metro Bank completed the £3.04 billion sale of a residential mortgage portfolio to NatWest. The deal was agreed upon in December 2020.

In November 2021, Metro Bank entered talks with the Carlyle Group concerning a possible takeover bid.

On 6–8 October 2022, Metro Bank's mobile banking app failed, resulting in its customers being unable to manage their accounts remotely.

In October 2023, it was revealed that JPMorgan Chase had considered a bid for Metro Bank before opting not to proceed due to the capital required by the bank. Metro was also claimed to have rejected an offer from fellow challenger bank Shawbrook.

On 8 October 2023, Metro Bank secured a £325m capital raise alongside £600m of debt refinancing with Jaime Gilinski Bacal, the second richest person in Colombia, becoming the controlling shareholder with around a 53% stake in the business.

In November 2024, Metro Bank was fined £16.7 million by the Financial Conduct Authority for failing to ensure an automated system was correctly checking customer transactions for potential money laundering until four years after it was installed.

== Services ==
Metro Bank provides banking services to personal and business customers. It is authorised by the Prudential Regulation Authority and regulated by both the Financial Conduct Authority and the Prudential Regulation Authority.

== Management ==
=== Senior leadership ===
- Chairman: Robert Sharpe (since November 2020)
- Chief Executive: Dan Frumkin (since February 2020)

=== Former chairmen ===
1. Anthony Thomson (2010–2012)
2. Vernon Hill (2013–2019)

=== Former chief executives ===
1. Craig Donaldson (2010–2019)

== See also ==
- List of banks in the United Kingdom
