= Commerce Bancorp =

Former American bank

- Industry: Bank holding company
- Founded: 1973
- Defunct: May 30, 2008
- Fate: Acquisition by Toronto-Dominion Bank, merged into TD Banknorth and rebranded to TD Bank
- Successor: TD Bank
- Headquarters: Cherry Hill, New Jersey, U.S.
- Products: Financial services

Commerce Bancorp was a Cherry Hill, New Jersey–based bank created in 1973. In 2007, it was purchased by Toronto-Dominion Bank, which merged Commerce into TD Banknorth, the latter of which was rebranded to TD Bank.

== History ==
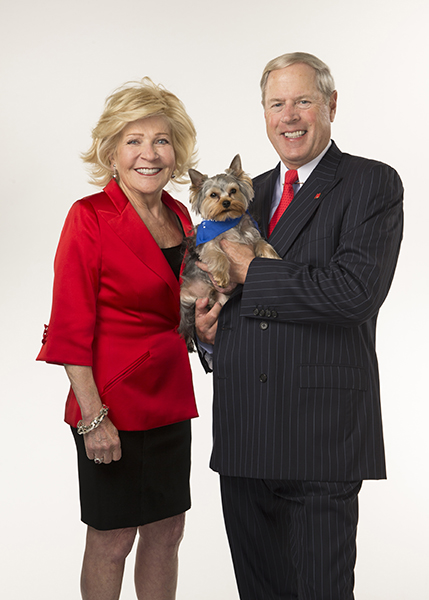
Shirley and Vernon Hill in 2011

The company was founded in 1973 by fast-food restaurant franchise owner Vernon Hill, a graduate of the Wharton School of the University of Pennsylvania. Hill sought to bring fast food convenience to banking and expanded Commerce from one location to over 435 in thirty-three years. With growth of over sixty-five new stores opening annually, the company had planned to reach at least 800 stores by 2010. During the early-mid 2000s, television advertisements for Commerce Bank featured Kelly Ripa and Regis Philbin. In 2006, Commerce purchased eMoney Advisor for $32 million in stock.

In 2004, two Commerce executives were sentenced to more than two years in prison after being convicted of approving loans to Philadelphia’s treasurer (who was sentenced to ten years in prison) and others in order to get the inside track on city banking business.

The federal Office of the Comptroller of Currency and the Federal Reserve’s investigation of insider dealing at Commerce (unrelated to the Philadelphia case) led to a settlement with the bank (no charges were filed) that included restrictions on the bank’s expansion. Hill then retired as chairman, president and chief executive officer. Hill sued Commerce in 2008, saying he was fired without cause and was owed more than $57 million in severance and damages. In 2013, a federal court ruled that Commerce could not legally pay Hill because the bank had refused to “to certify it had no reason to believe Hill had committed fraud, breached his fiduciary duty or abused his insider privileges.”

== Business model ==
Commerce's philosophy was that they were retailers, not bankers, and went so far as to call their various locations stores, not branches.

Features that Commerce offered its customers included:

- "America's most convenient bank"
- Seven-day lobby or drive-thru hours in Center City Philadelphia and Manhattan with the exception of branches in Paramus, New Jersey (Bergen County law requires most businesses to be closed on Sunday)
- Instant creation of ATM cards on the spot at the time of account opening
- No overdraft fees on debit card usage
- Free "penny arcade" coin counting machines for both customers and non-customers
- No-fee Visa gift cards for customers
- Lollipops and dog biscuits in the lobby and drive-thru
- Foreign ATM fee reimbursement (if you maintain a daily balance of $2,500 through the statement cycle)
- "No Stupid Fees, No Stupid Hours"

Commerce Bank's business model generated what some called a cult following in the areas where they had stores. Commerce offered its customers merchandising giveaways such as coffee mugs, pens and pencils; in 2006 alone, the locations gave out 28 million free pens.

This model was described in the case study HBS 9-603-080 from Harvard Business School, published in 2002.

Commerce had high expenses, leading to less profit than its competitors: In 2004, “stratospheric” capital expenditures resulted in a net income per employee of $25,000, compared to $135,000 per employee for another fast-growing bank in the same region. Operating profit margin declined to 16 percent in 2006 from 26 percent in 2004. An example of such high costs: To enter New York City’s Chinatown market, the company likely spent $306,790 on gifts of rice cookers for fourteen thousand new accounts opened for as little as $250.

Commerce had the lowest deposit rates in each of the local markets it served. But Commerce choosing to be “worst in class on some service dimensions,” including “dismal deposit rates,” generated additional capital for funding extended business hours and in-depth customer service, and free checking accounts “in exchange for little or no interest.”

Commerce’s Penny Arcade coin-counting deposit machines could be used without charge even by noncustomers, and raised funds for medical research and hurricane relief. Later, some were retired by successor TD Bank in 2016 “in the wake of lawsuits claiming that the machines were short-changing customers.

== Mascots ==
Commerce Bank had an official mascot, Mr. C, whose costume was the Commerce Bank logo, a red letter "C", with black arms and black legs. He always had a huge smile and large bushy eyebrows. Mr. C. was retired as a result of the TD acquisition.

== Expansion ==
While most of Commerce Bank's growth was organic, there were five large acquisitions:

- early 1990s - Four branch offices were purchased from Long Island-based Anchor Savings Bank: Cherry Hill Mall, Bellmawr, Woodcrest and West Deptford.
- January 21, 1997 - Independence Bancorp, Inc. became Commerce Bank/North.
- August 13, 1998 - Community First Banking Company and its subsidiary Tinton Falls State Bank became Commerce Bank/Shore.
- September 17, 1998 - Prestige Financial Corp. and its subsidiary, Prestige State Bank became Commerce Bank/Central
- July 25, 2005 - Palm Beach County Bank established Commerce Bank in Southeast Florida.

== Controversies ==
Loans to its own executives and directors totaled $145.7 million in 2003. Commerce said these loans were appropriate because they were made in the ordinary course of business and on ordinary terms. Commerce also contracted with entities controlled by Vernon Hill and his family for interior design (InterArch, owned by Vernon Hill’s spouse) and real estate (Vernon Hill was a personal investor in Commerce’s rent-generating properties; and his son earned brokerage commissions when his private firm found properties for new Commerce branch locations; and Commerce paid for employees’ use of Galloway National Golf Club, owned by Vernon Hill).

== Commerce Bank Harrisburg ==
Commerce Bank had an independent franchise in the Central Pennsylvania region called Pennsylvania Commerce Bancorp, Inc, locally known as Commerce Bank Harrisburg. Commerce Bank shared a call center with Commerce Bank Harrisburg and owned approximately 11% of its stock. When Commerce Bank was acquired by TD Bank in 2007, Commerce Bank Harrisburg was not included in the sale. In November 2008, Commerce Bank Harrisburg announced plans to acquire Republic First Bank of Philadelphia in a tax-free all-stock transaction and would be known as Metro Bank as the result of a merger. That following August, Commerce Bank Harrisburg extended its deadline to acquire Republic First after it was unable to gain timely regulatory approval. But in March 2010 both boards of directors voted to terminate their merger agreement due to uncertainty that the merger application would receive regulatory approval. In June 2009, Commerce Bank Harrisburg announced it was going ahead with rebrand to Metro Bank (Metro Bancorp Inc), because its license to use the Commerce Bank brand and red “C” logo, granted by Commerce Bank was expiring. On February 12, 2016, Metro Bank ceased to exist after its US$474 million merger with First National Bank was completed.

Metro Bank had 33 branches in Berks, Cumberland, Dauphin, Lancaster, Lebanon, and York counties. It was headquartered in Swatara Township, just outside Harrisburg.

== "Commerce Bank" brand ==
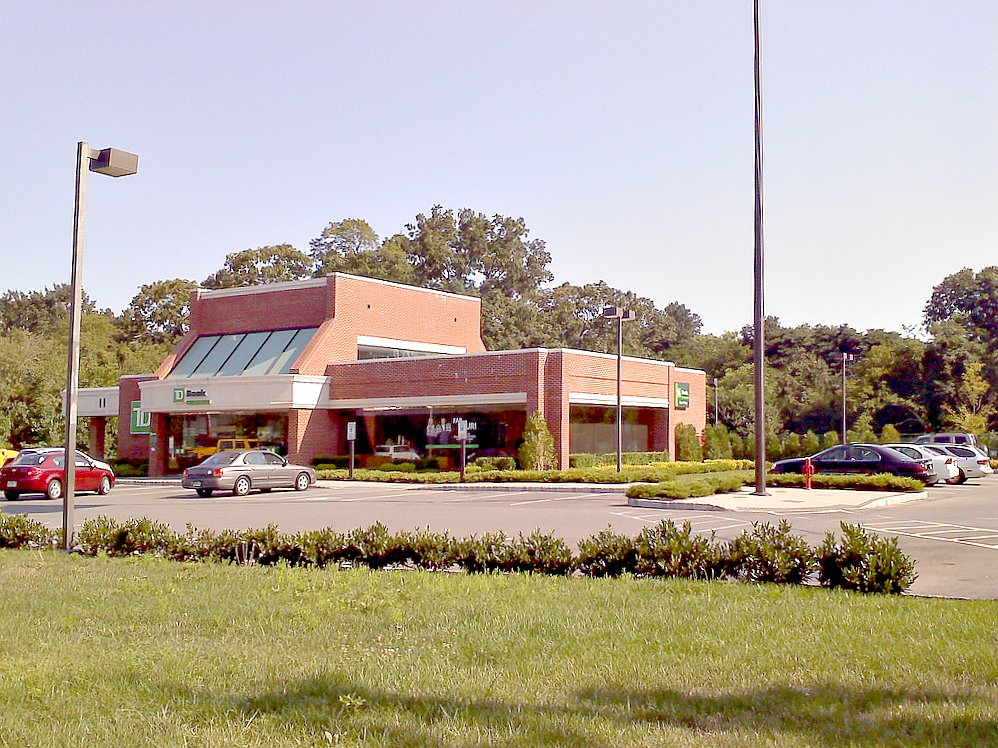
A former Commerce Bank in Tuckerton, New Jersey, that was rebranded as TD Bank in 2009. Almost every Commerce Bank branch was built in this style, and is recognizable even after the merger.

Several banks in the United States have traded under the name "Commerce Bank" or similar names, leading to brand confusion. As a result, Commerce Bank and Trust Company in Worcester, Massachusetts successfully sued TD Bank to stop it from using the name "TD Commerce Bank", which it had planned to trade under following its acquisition of Commerce Bancorp. However, Commerce Bancshares, in Kansas City, Missouri, and Commerce National Bank, in Columbus, Ohio both still exist and do business under their respective names, even though they are unaffiliated with the now-defunct Commerce Bancorp.

== TD Bank acquisition ==
The TD Bank logo

On October 2, 2007, TD Bank Financial Group (TDBFG) and Commerce Bancorp, Inc. announced that they had signed a definitive deal agreement for TDBFG to acquire Commerce Bank in a 75% stock and 25% cash transaction valued at US$8.5 billion.

Under the agreement, Commerce shareholders received 0.4142 shares of a TD common share and US$10.50 in cash in exchange for each common share of Commerce Bancorp Inc. The consideration was negotiated on the basis of US$42.00 per share value for Commerce Bank. The transaction value based on the October 1, 2007 closing price of TD common shares is $42.37.

After TD Bank acquired Commerce Bancorp, Vernon Hill subsequently left that company and instead joined Republic Bank, recreating Republic Bank as a 'retail store' bank.

== See also ==
- Metro Bank (UK)
- Republic Bank
