= Pet insurance =

Insurance that reimburses veterinary costs

Pet insurance is a type of insurance that pays, partly or in total, for veterinary treatment of the insured person's ill or injured pet. Some policies will pay out when the pet dies, or if the pet is lost or stolen.

As veterinary medicine is increasingly employing expensive medical techniques and drugs, and owners have higher expectations for their pets' health care and standard of living than previously, the market for pet insurance has increased. The cost of veterinary care has increased significantly.

== History ==
The first pet insurance policy was written in 1890 in Sweden by Claes Virgin. Virgin was the founder of Länsförsäkrings Alliance, and initially focused on horses and livestock. In 1947 the first pet insurance policy was sold in Britain. As of 2009, Britain had the second-highest level of pet insurance in the world (23%), behind only Sweden. In the United States as of 2024, fewer than 5% of all pets were covered by an insurance policy.

As pet ownership has grown in the United States, so have expenses and the popularity of pet insurance. In 2022, Americans spent $136.8 billion on their pets, which was an increase of nearly 11% compared to 2021. As of 2022, the number of insured pets has increased 125% since 2018.

As costs rise, increasingly pet owners report difficulty covering vet bills. Pet insurance can help bridge this gap, partially reimbursing owners for unexpected pet care.

== Policies ==
Pet insurance is a form of property insurance rather than health insurance. Insurance companies may limit coverage for pre-existing conditions, giving owners an incentive to insure even very young animals, which are not expected to incur high veterinary costs. Some British policies for dogs also include third-party liability insurance. For example, if a dog causes a car accident that damages a vehicle, the insurer provides payouts to rectify the damage for which the owner is responsible under the Animals Act 1971.

== Major pet insurance providers ==
The pet insurance industry includes a mix of independent specialty insurers, multinational insurance companies, and newer digital-first entrants. Notable examples include: Trupanion, Inc., an American pet insurance company offering comprehensive accident and illness coverage in North America and other regions. Trupanion is a publicly traded provider known for direct payment options with participating veterinarians. Fetch Pet Insurance, a U.S.–Canada provider that evolved from Petplan and offers accident and illness coverage through multiple underwriting partners. Petplan UK, a long-established pet insurer in the United Kingdom covering a range of veterinary treatments and conditions. Nibbles, a newer entrant based in Austin, Texas, offers pet insurance as an integrated benefit within its credit-card-linked product. The Nibbles Pet Rewards Credit Card provides built-in pet insurance coverage for eligible dogs and cats, along with rewards for pet-related purchases, and processes claims through its card platform. Coverage limits and terms are structured similarly to traditional pet insurance plans but are contingent on active cardholder status. Other traditional providers in the U.S. and internationally include ASPCA Pet Health Insurance, Embrace, Lemonade Pet Insurance, Pets Best, Figo, Pumpkin, Prudent Pet, and Nationwide (which offers pet policies under various partner brands). Industry lists also include many regional and specialty insurers.

== How pet insurance works ==
Pet insurance policies typically require policyholders to pay for veterinary services upfront and submit claims to the insurer for reimbursement. The insurer reimburses eligible expenses according to the policy’s terms, which may include reimbursement percentages (commonly 70–90%), deductibles, and limits on annual or per-condition benefits. Waiting periods often apply before coverage begins, and most products do not cover pre-existing conditions. Some insurers offer direct payment to veterinarians if prior arrangements exist between the insurer and the clinic.

== Regulation and regional markets ==
=== Australia ===
In Australia, pet insurance is written as a class of general insurance and supervised under a "twin peaks" model in which the Australian Prudential Regulation Authority (APRA) oversees the prudential soundness of insurers and the Australian Securities and Investments Commission (ASIC) regulates market conduct and disclosure. General insurers that underwrite pet policies must be authorised by APRA under the Insurance Act 1973, while distributors and managing general agents generally require an Australian financial services licence from ASIC under the Corporations Act 2001.

Pet insurance products are also subject to the Insurance Contracts Act 1984 and industry self-regulation through the General Insurance Code of Practice and a voluntary Pet Insurance Industry Code of Practice administered by the Insurance Council of Australia, which sets expectations for product design, pre-existing condition definitions, waiting periods, claims handling and complaints processes. ASIC has undertaken several reviews of pet insurance disclosure and design, including stop orders on some products where target market determinations and product features were found not to comply with design and distribution obligations.

=== New Zealand ===
In New Zealand, pet insurance is offered as a form of general insurance. Prudential oversight of licensed insurers is carried out by the Reserve Bank of New Zealand (RBNZ) under the Insurance (Prudential Supervision) Act 2010, while the Financial Markets Authority (FMA) is responsible for conduct regulation and licensing of financial service providers that distribute insurance products.

The wider insurance sector is also subject to industry codes such as the Fair Insurance Code promoted by the Insurance Council of New Zealand, which set expectations for claims handling, disclosure and complaint resolution in addition to statutory consumer protection rules. Pet insurance is commonly sold by general insurers and branded partners and is governed by the same prudential and conduct frameworks that apply to other retail insurance products.

=== United States ===
In the United States, insurance - including pet insurance - is regulated primarily at the state level. State departments of insurance license insurers and intermediaries and oversee product forms, pricing and market conduct, while the National Association of Insurance Commissioners (NAIC) develops model laws and coordination frameworks for adoption by individual states.

In 2020, the NAIC established a Pet Insurance Working Group to develop a model law aimed at creating more consistent standards for disclosures, policy terms and consumer protections across states. The industry association NAPHIA, whose members account for the majority of pet health insurance in force, has supported this process and has argued that the framework should balance consumer transparency with scope for product innovation. As states adopt pet-insurance-specific legislation based on the NAIC model, pet insurance is expected to move from being regulated under general property and casualty rules toward a more harmonised regime.

=== Canada ===
In Canada, insurance regulation is shared between federal and provincial authorities. Federally regulated insurers are supervised on a prudential basis by the Office of the Superintendent of Financial Institutions (OSFI), while provincial and territorial regulators oversee market conduct, licensing of insurers and intermediaries, and enforcement of consumer protection laws.

Co-ordination across jurisdictions is provided by the Canadian Council of Insurance Regulators (CCIR), an inter-jurisdictional body whose mandate is to promote an efficient and effective insurance regulatory system and to develop common approaches to market-conduct oversight. Pet insurance products are generally treated as a subset of property and casualty insurance and are therefore subject to the same provincial statutes and conduct expectations as other retail general-insurance products, including risk-based market-conduct supervision frameworks that focus on sales practices, underwriting and claims handling.

== Economic effects ==
Studies have analyzed how pet insurance influences veterinary spending and pet owners’ decisions. Research suggests that insured owners may spend more on comprehensive veterinary care than uninsured owners, reflecting both increased utilization of services and financial risk mitigation. This behavior aligns with market data showing sustained double-digit growth in the sector, with global premiums increasing at an estimated 11–15% CAGR between 2019 and 2024. Pet insurance also serves as a financial planning tool for owners, helping to manage unexpected veterinary expenses.
