= Rainbow Bridge (pets) =

Theme of several works of poetry

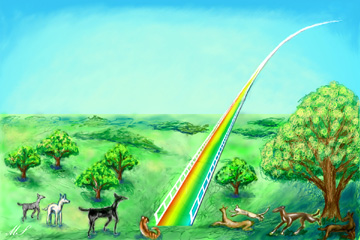
The Rainbow Bridge is a meadow where animals wait for their humans to join them, and the bridge that takes them all to Heaven, together.

The Rainbow Bridge is the theme of several works written first in 1959, then in the 1980s and 1990s, that speak of an other-worldly place where pets go upon death, eventually to be reunited with their owners. One is a short story by Edna Clyne-Rekhy. The other is a six-stanza poem of rhyming pentameter couplets, created by a couple to help ease the pain of friends who lost pets. Each has gained popularity around the world among animal lovers who have lost a pet or wild animals that are cared for. The belief has many antecedents, including similarities to the Bifröst bridge of Norse mythology.

== Story ==
The story tells of a lush green meadow just "this side of Heaven" (i.e., before one enters it). Rainbow Bridge is the name of both the meadow and the adjoining pan-prismatic conveyance connecting it to Heaven.

According to the story, when a pet dies, it goes to the meadow, restored to perfect health and free of any injuries. The pet runs and plays all day with the others; there is always fresh food and water, and the sun is always shining. However, it is said that while the pet is at peace and happy, it also misses its owner whom it left behind on Earth.

When its owner dies, they arrive at the meadow and the pet greets its former owner, then they cross the Rainbow Bridge together into Heaven, never again to be separated.

== Authorship ==
In February 2023, authorship of the original story was confirmed by National Geographic magazine as Edna Clyne-Rekhy, a then-82-year-old artist from Scotland.

Having been circulated widely around the world, the prose poem's original authorship was uncertain. William N. Britton claimed in 1994 that it was told to him by a Native American shaman, and Wallace Sife, head of the Association for Pet Loss and Bereavement, believed it was a variation of his poem "All Pets Go to Heaven."

However, American author Paul Koudounaris, a member of The Order of the Good Death, published an article in February 2023, in which he detangled the history of the poem and provided proof, including the original handwritten manuscript of the text, which make it clear that the author is Edna Clyne-Rekhy, who wrote it as a teenager in Scotland in 1959 to mourn the death of her dog Major. Koudounaris found Clyne from a stray third-hand reference online. The article explained that she had originally considered the Rainbow Bridge to be private and kept it to herself. But she had typed out copies to give to friends, who were moved by the words and passed them on. But since these copies lacked her name, the Rainbow Bridge eventually became disconnected from its author. Eventually it was introduced to U.S. readers in 1994 when "Dear Abby", an advice column with a wide newspaper circulation, printed it in its entirety, but unattributed. It then became a staple in pet mourning circles, and later popular on the internet.

A Washington Post reporter opines that: "It is, in free verse form, 'Chicken Soup for the Soul' for an exploding $69 billion pet care industry."

== Background ==
The concept of a paradise where pets wait for their human owners appeared much earlier, in the little-known sequel to Beautiful Joe, Margaret Marshall Saunders' book Beautiful Joe's Paradise. In this green land, the animals do not simply await their owners, but also help each other learn and grow and recover from mistreatment they may have endured in life. But the animals come to this land, and continue to true heaven, not by a bridge but by balloon.

The first mention of the "Rainbow Bridge" story online is a post on the newsgroup rec.pets.dogs, dated 7 January 1993, quoting the poem from a 1992 (or earlier) issue of Mid-Atlantic Great Dane Rescue League Newsletter, which in turn is stated to have quoted it from the Akita Rescue Society of America. Other posts from 1993 suggest it was already well established and being circulated online at that time, enough for the quotation of even a single line to be recognized by other newsgroup readers.

== See also ==
- Affectional bond
- Deathbed phenomena – A range of experiences often involves sightings of deceased pets, and is noted to be effectual to ease grief.
- "The Hunt", an episode of The Twilight Zone
- Pet humanization
- Sematary – American rapper with three albums on this theme
