= Fetch Pet Insurance =

American pet insurance company

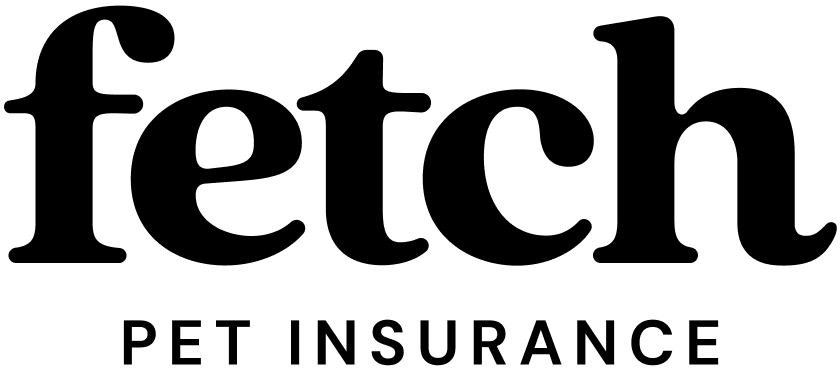
- Type: Privately held
- Industry: Pet insurance
- Founded: 11 September 2003; 23 years ago
- Founders: Chris and Natasha Ashton
- Headquarters: 101 Greenwich St., New York City, New York, USA
- Area served: United States and Canada
- Key people: Paul Guyardo (CEO)
- Number of employees: 200+
- Website: www.fetchpet.com

Fetch is a pet insurance provider and pet health company headquartered in New York City.

== History ==
Fetch was founded in September 2003 by husband and wife entrepreneurs Chris and Natasha Ashton after experiencing a high veterinary bill. In November 2003, Fetch Inc. was awarded the exclusive license for the Petplan brand in the United States. In 2007, the company began selling its first policies, and started selling policies online later that year. The company formed partnerships with animal shelters, veterinarians, and health insurance providers to help sell 120,000 policies by 2014.

In 2019, Petplan hired Paul Guyardo as the new CEO. The same year it was acquired by private equity firm, Warburg Pincus. At the time, it had 200 employees and $130 million in annual sales. Since the acquisition, the company expanded into technology including a mobile app in 2020 for communication and access to insurance plans and pet health/wellness information.

In 2020, The Dodo, an animal media brand of Group Nine Media Inc., took a minority stake in Petplan. The deal also included a brand-licensing and marketing-services arrangement.

In 2021, AXIS Insurance partnered with Fetch to serve as its key underwriter.

In September 2022, Fetch announced its dog disease database and predictive pet health tool, “Fetch Health Forecast,” which draws clinical data points from medical claims to make predictions about potential future medical conditions and vet expenses.

Since 2022, Fetch has supported Project Street Vet, a nonprofit providing free veterinary care to pets of homeless people, by matching public donations to the charity. In 2023, it also launched a limited-edition Fetch Pale Ale with Torch & Crown Brewing to raise money for the charity.

In 2023, Fetch partnered with pet telehealth platform Vetster to offer virtual veterinary appointments.

Fetch partnered with The Garfield Movie in 2024 as its exclusive pet insurance sponsor, launching a marketing campaign tied to the film's release.

In July 2025, Fetch partnered with SATELLAI to develop an artificial intelligence (AI)-powered dog collar called the “SATELLAI Collar.” The collar offers training options, a virtual fence, and insights into dogs’ behavior, energy levels, and rest patterns.

Since 2025, the company has hosted an annual gala at The Carlyle Hotel in New York in support of animal-welfare and Broadway charities, with performers including Bernadette Peters, Darren Criss and Ariana DeBose in 2026.

== Products ==
Fetch offers insurance for pets in the United States and Canada. It insures cats and dogs beginning at six weeks old with comprehensive coverage. Fetch extended its coverage during the COVID-19 pandemic. The new service covered treatment of a COVID-infected pet, boarding of a pet if an owner was infected, and adding a pet guardian to a plan.

In response to customer demand for wellness benefits, Fetch added three tiered preventive care plans in 2023.
