= Commerce Bank & Trust Company =

American financial institution

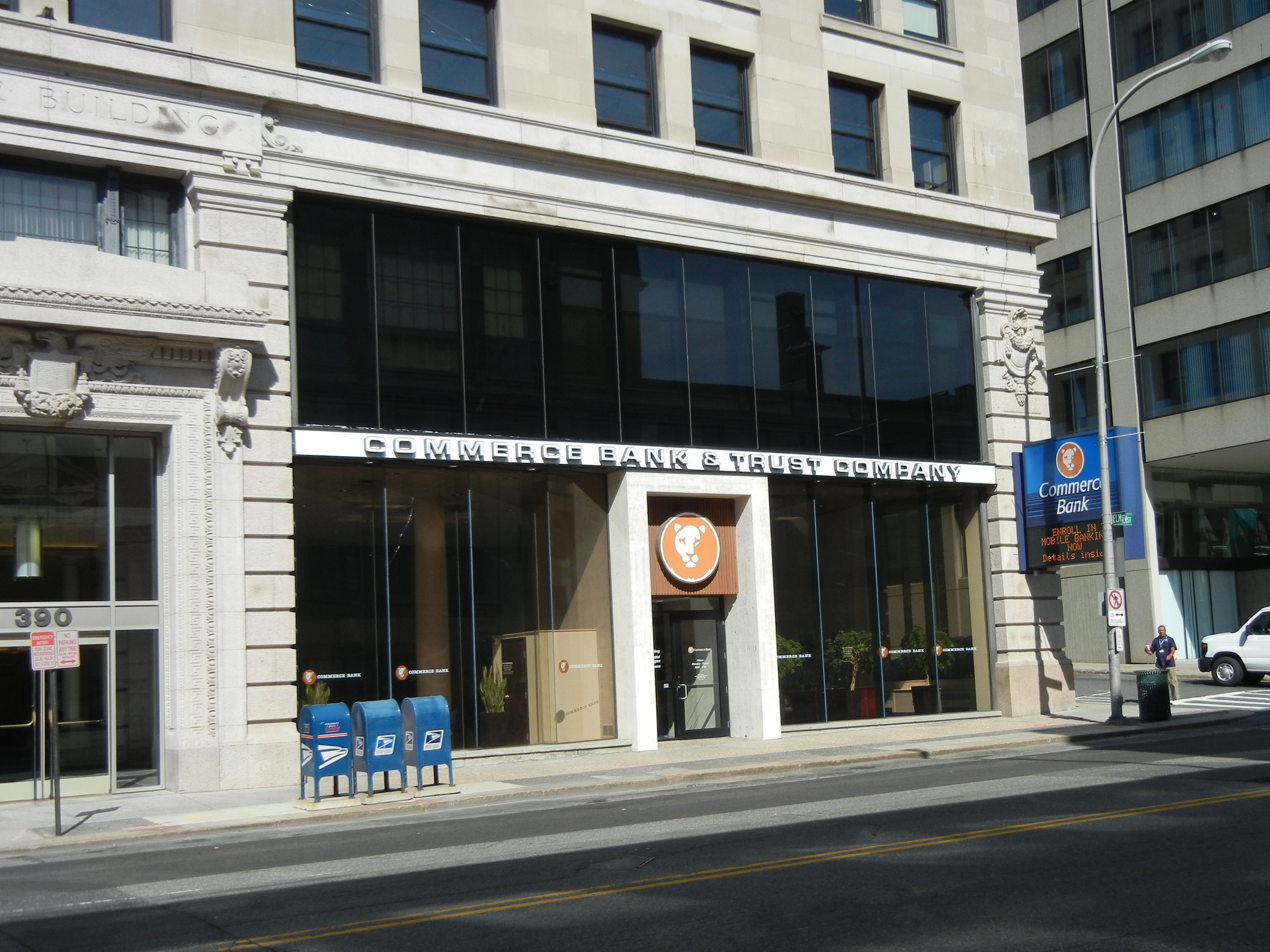
- Commerce Bank headquarters
- Founded: 6 July 1955
- Headquarters: 386 Main Street, Worcester, Massachusetts, United States
- Key people: David G. Massad Chairman; Brian W. Thompson President and Chief Executive Officer
- Owner: Berkshire Hills Bank Corporation
- Website: bankatcommerce.com

Commerce Bank & Trust Company is a financial institution based in Worcester, Massachusetts, with 16 branches located throughout central and eastern Massachusetts. Commerce Bank & Trust was founded in 1955 and is now a full-service commercial bank with branch offices in Worcester, Holden, Leominster, Marlborough, Milford, Shrewsbury, Webster, West Boylston, Westborough, and, through its recent acquisition of Mercantile Bank & Trust Company, Boston.

In August 2012, Commerce Bank & Trust Company completed its acquisition of Boston-based Mercantile Capital Corp. and its subsidiary, Mercantile Bank & Trust Co. The three Mercantile Bank & Trust offices, located in the Fenway, South End, and Brighton sections of Boston, are now operating as branches of Commerce Bank & Trust Company. The combined organization has assets of $1.93 billion and 16 retail banking offices servicing people and businesses across Central and Eastern Massachusetts.

== Legal dispute with TD Banknorth ==
In March 2008, Commerce Bank & Trust filed a lawsuit against Maine-based TD Banknorth and New Jersey–based Commerce Bank, to bar the merging banks from using the name TD Commerce Bank in Massachusetts.

On May 2, 2008, federal Judge F. Dennis Saylor granted a preliminary injunction, prohibiting the use of the TD Commerce name in Massachusetts branches.

In July 2008, TD Banknorth and New Jersey–based Commerce Bank announced they would abandon plans to rebrand their combined operations as "TD Commerce Bank". Instead, the latter two banks announced that they would be rebranding themselves as TD Bank.

== Acquisition of Commerce Bank by Berkshire Hills Bancorp ==
In May 2017, Berkshire Hills Bancorp agreed to acquire Commerce Bancshares Corp., the parent company of Worcester-based Commerce Bank, in a stock deal valued at $209 million. The acquisition was completed on October 13, 2017. Following that, the entity once known as "Commerce Bank & Trust Company" became known as "Commerce Bank (a Division of Berkshire Bank)".
