= Petplan UK =

British pet insurance company

Pet Plan Limited
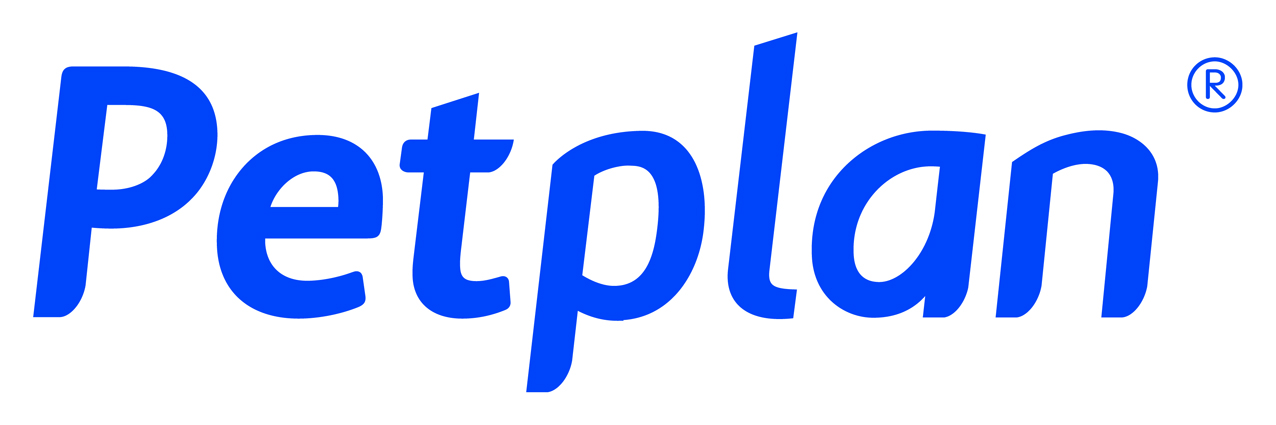
- Trade name: Petplan
- Type: Private
- Industry: Pet insurance
- Founded: 1976
- Founder: Patsy Bloom and David Simpson
- Headquarters: London, United Kingdom
- Number of locations: United Kingdom
- Area served: United Kingdom
- Products: Pet insurance
- Services: Insurance for pets
- Parent: Allianz Insurance plc
- Website: petplan.co.uk

Pet Plan Limited, trading as Petplan, is a London-based pet insurance company. It is a subsidiary of Allianz Insurance plc, part of the Allianz Global Group. Petplan is the largest pet insurance provider in the UK.

== History ==
Petplan was launched in 1976 by Patsy Bloom and David Simpson. When it was launched, Petplan products covered domestic cats and dogs, with cover extending to rabbits. The company was acquired by Cornhill Insurance in May 1996.

== Services and subsidiaries ==
Petplan insurance covers unexpected illnesses, accident and injuries for dogs, cats and rabbits. Policies provide coverage for hereditary, congenital and chronic conditions – including cancer, diagnostic testing, prescription medications, non-routine dental treatment, MRI, CAT scan and ultrasound imaging as standard.

Petplan’s Covered For Life policies re-fresh the veterinary fee benefit each year providing ongoing cover for the life of the pet as long as the policy is renewed annually with no break in cover

Like other pet insurance companies, Petplan does not cover pre-existing conditions. Pre-existing conditions are defined as those medical conditions that first occurred or showed clinical signs or symptoms before the effective date of the policy, or that occurred or showed clinical signs or symptoms within the first fourteen days of the policy.

=== Petplan Equine ===
Founded in 1988, Petplan Equine is an offshoot of Petplan UK that provides horse and rider insurance throughout the UK.

== Philanthropy ==
Petplan works with more than 1,200 charities throughout the UK. Partners include: Battersea Dogs & Cats Home, Blue Cross, Cats Protection, Dogs Trust, and the Scottish SPCA. In 1994, the Petplan Charitable Trust was formed to raise funds to promote the health and welfare of animals. In 2013, Petplan launched the annual Animal Charity Awards in conjunction with the Association of Dog and Cat Homes which recognise animal charities and non-profit animal organisations across the UK who help to rescue and rehome animals.
