= B+H Architects =

Canadian architectural and engineering firm

- Formerly: Bregman + Hamann Architects
- Company type: Private
- Industry: Architecture, Interior Design, Urban planning
- Founded: 1953; 73 years ago
- Founder: Sidney Bregman, George Frederick Hamann
- Headquarters: 481 University Avenue, Toronto, Ontario, Canada
- Number of employees: 450+
- Website: bharchitects.com

B+H Architects or BH Architects (formerly Bregman + Hamann Architects) is a Canadian architectural and engineering firm headquartered in Toronto, Ontario. The firm was founded in 1953 by Sidney Bregman and George Hamann.

B+H is a member of the Surbana Jurong Group.

== Firm ==
=== Founders ===
Founders Bregman (Born in Warsaw, Poland, died February 9, 2014, Toronto) and Hamann (Born in Toronto, June 14, 1928, died February 9, 2013, in Newmarket, Ontario) had both studied at the University of Toronto. Hamann retired from the firm in 1987.

=== Headquarters ===
In October 2019, B+H signed a lease for an office space in a heritage building in Toronto. Patrick Fejer is a senior design principal for this renovation for B+H's future office. B+H is redesigning and renovating the interior of the building, while special considerations will be taken to the historic integrity of the existing heritage building. The existing building, the Permanent (Canada Permanent Trust Building), is located at 320 Bay Street and was originally designed by Henry Sproatt, in 1931.

== Projects ==
=== Recent Canadian work ===
==== Institutional/Educational ====
- The York University Archives of Ontario + York Research Tower was completed in 2009, in Toronto, Ontario. B+H provided the architectural design for this project, and was the second runner-up for the Canadian Design Build Institute Design-Build Award of Excellence in 2012.
- B+H worked on the Ed Lumley Centre for Engineering Innovation for the University of Windsor, in 2013.
- In 2016, B+H completed a project with Hariri Pontarini Architects on the Faculty of Law, Jackman Law Building, for the University of Toronto. This renovation and expansion project won a Canadian Architect Award of Excellence in 2013. and features a LEED (Leadership in Energy and Environmental Design) Silver certification.
- B+H provided architectural work for the Humber College Learning Resource Commons, in Etobicoke, Ontario, completed in 2015. The project received a LEED Gold certification.
- The Joyce Centre for Partnership & Innovation (JCPI) at Mohawk College was completed in 2019. Located in Hamilton, Ontario. With sustainability as the main design principle, the JCPI is one of the largest net-zero buildings in Canada, working along with the ZCB Standard (Zero Carbon Building Standard). B+H provided architectural services as well as landscaping design services for the JCPI. This project was subjected to several awards regarding its sustainable strategies and dedication, including 2018 Engineering Project of the Year, 2018 Environmental Sustainability Award, 2018 Sustainable Project of the Year, and the 2017 Innovation in Sustainability Award. The Mohawk College project works towards the World Green Building Council and their Advancing Net Zero initiative, ensuring that all buildings, new and existing, are renovated or built to be net-zero carbon, by 2050. The JPCI produces more energy than what it consumes over the course of a year. The project includes an expansive 545-kilowatt solar panel array on the roof, as well as planting areas on the green roof. The technical labs and user spaces have been transformed with highly efficient mechanisms allowing the building to track its energy use, add and subtract power where it requires, and enables the building to be highly functional and efficient. The JPCI also has over twenty geothermal wells, stormwater harvesting, LED lighting controlled by sensor, highly efficient plumbing fixtures, and a set energy use target. The JPCI was the 2019 recipient of the Awards of Excellence Innovation in Architecture from the Royal Architectural Institute of Canada (RAIC).

=== Canadian projects ===
- While under the name Bregman + Hamann Architects, the firm worked on the Brookfield Place (formerly BCE Place) which was completed in 1992 in the financial district of Toronto, Ontario, as an architectural design and renewal project. The project is features a six-storey galleria (Allen Lambert Galleria) and it spans east–west along the entire length of the block, from Yonge Street to Bay Street (181 Bay Street), and extends onto Bay Street to provide a large outdoor canopy. At the other end of the galleria, there resides the Sam Pollock Square, where the Hockey Hall of Fame is located. This space is populated with various other commercial and retail shops, and restaurants. Through the galleria, there is access to the PATH, a series of walkways throughout downtown Toronto. Having the galleria intersect between two buildings allows for the architectural intent to come through, which is to grant public connection to the private domain.

=== Gallery ===
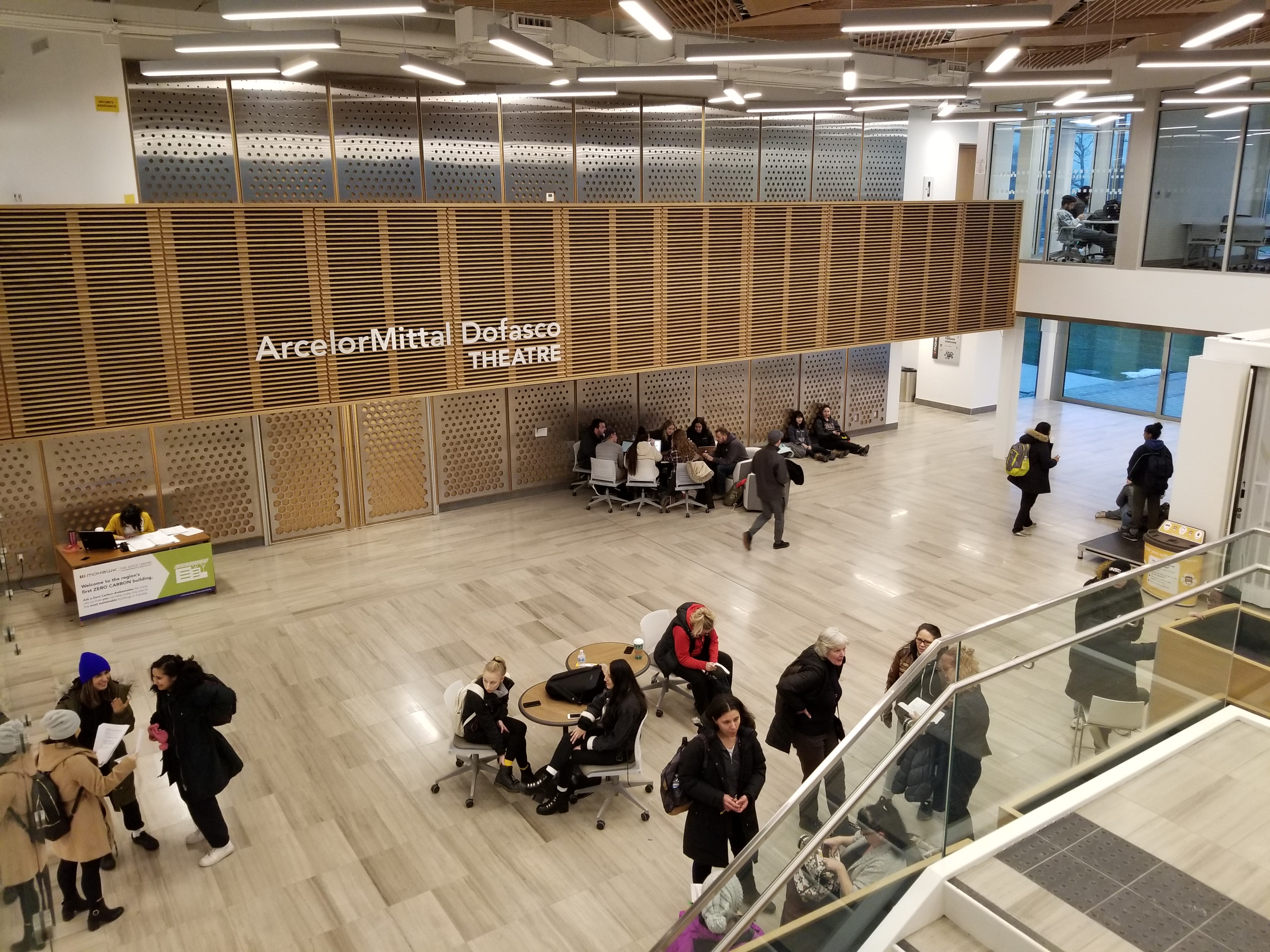
2015 The Joyce Centre for Partnership & Innovation (JCPI) Atrium, at Mohawk College, Hamilton, Ontario.

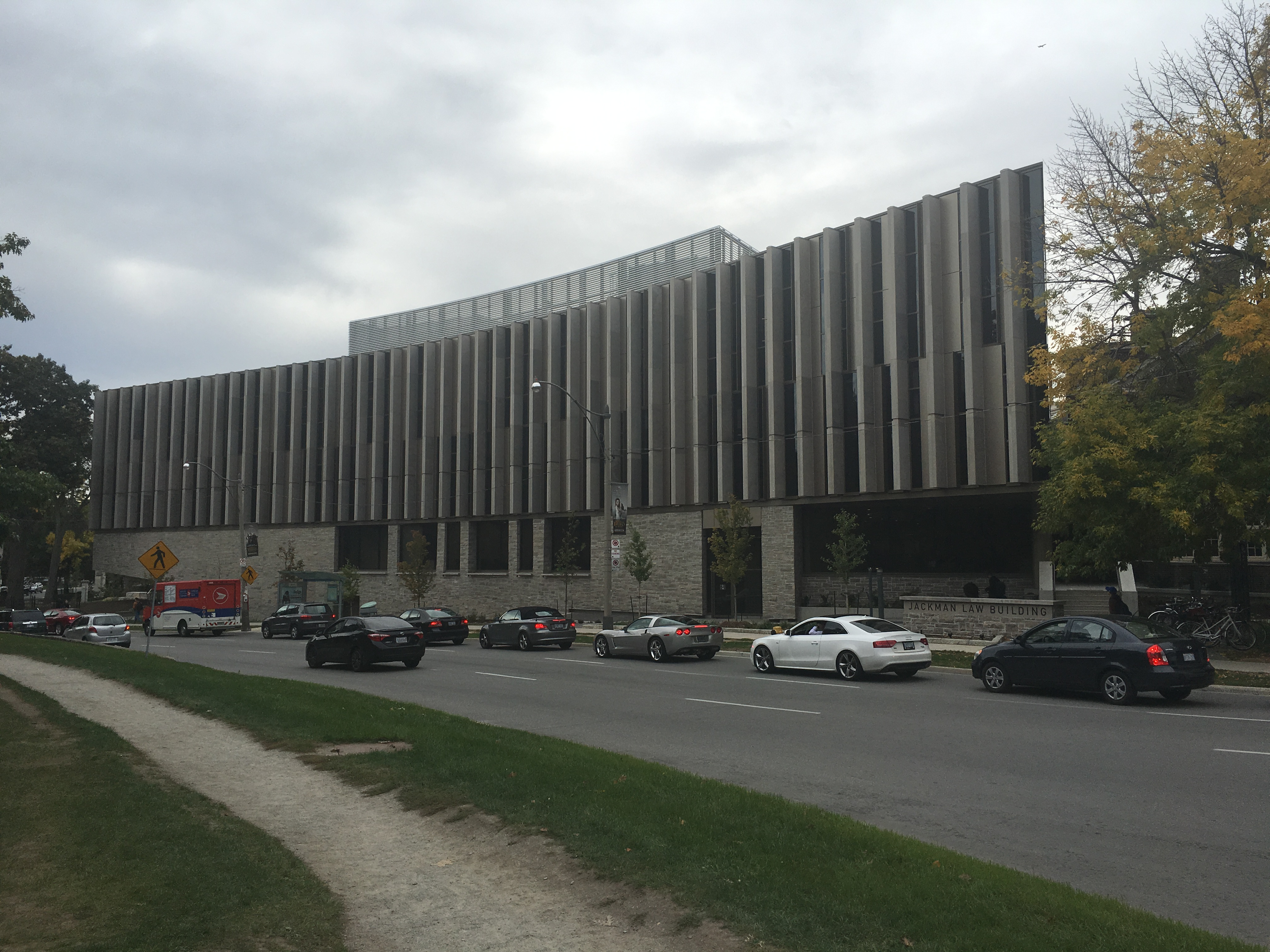
2016 Jackman Hall Law Building for the University of Toronto.

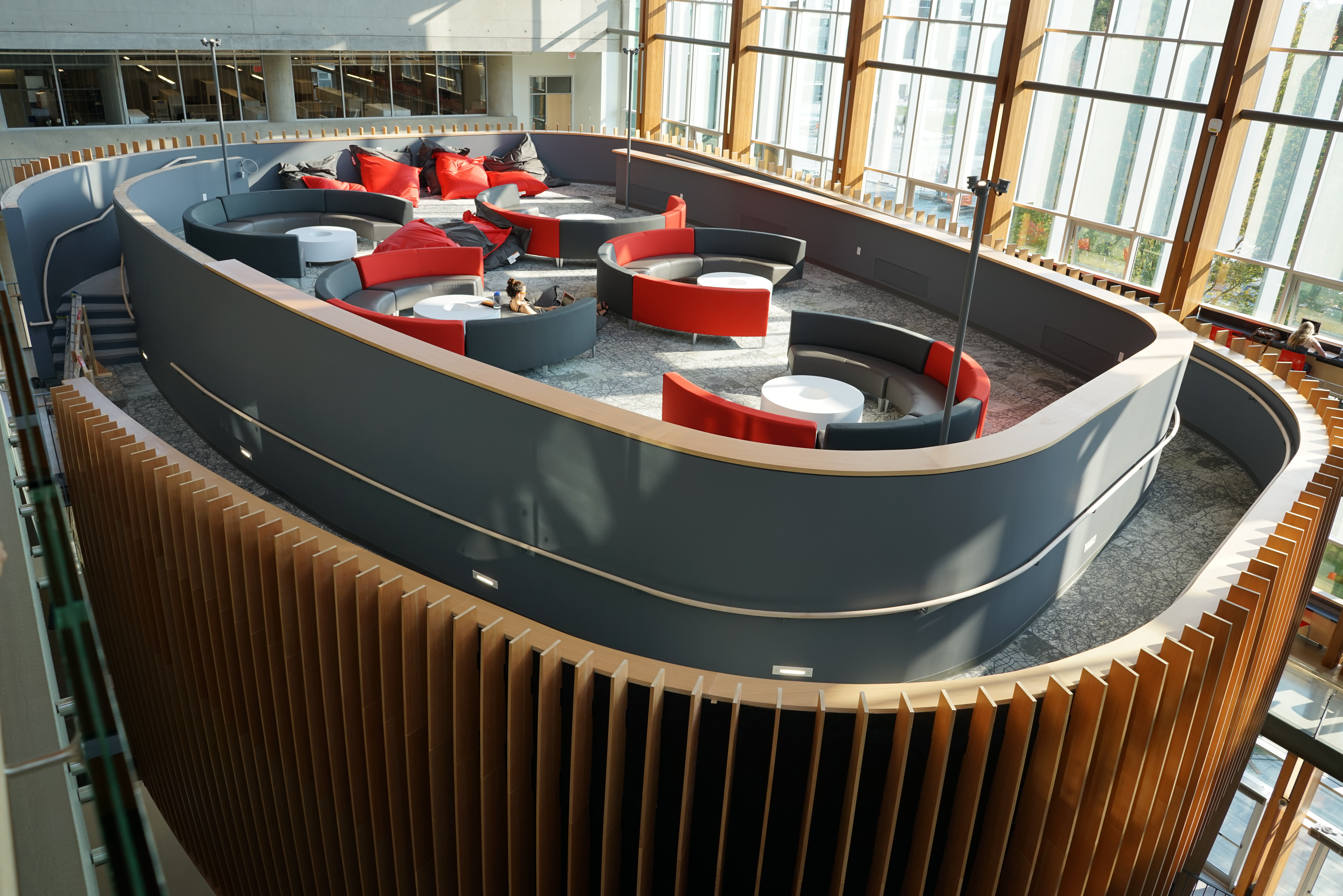
2019 AMS Nest, at University of British Columbia.

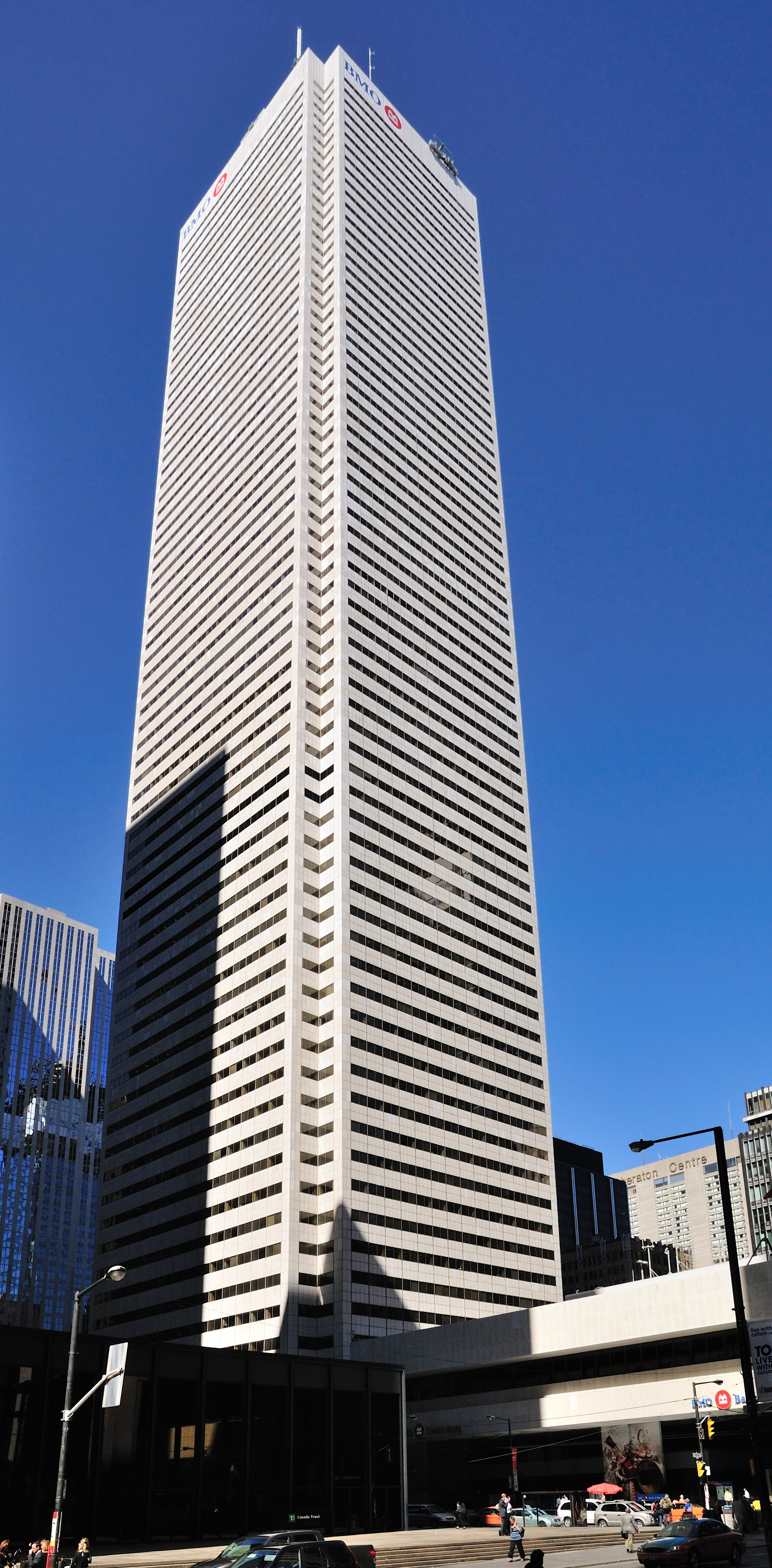
2012 Recladding of the First Canadian Place, Toronto.

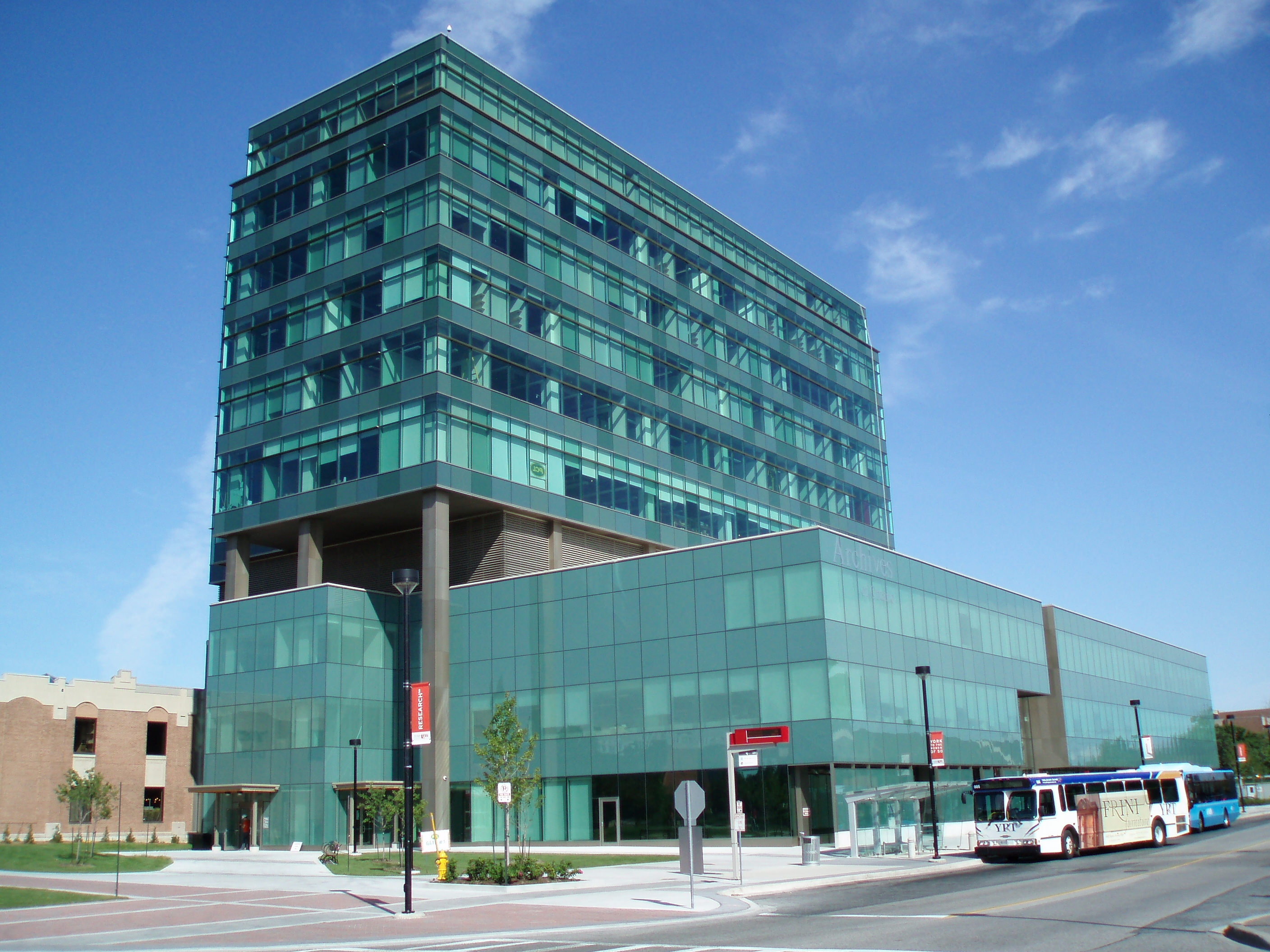
2009 Archives of Ontario + York Research Tower, York University, Toronto, Ontario.

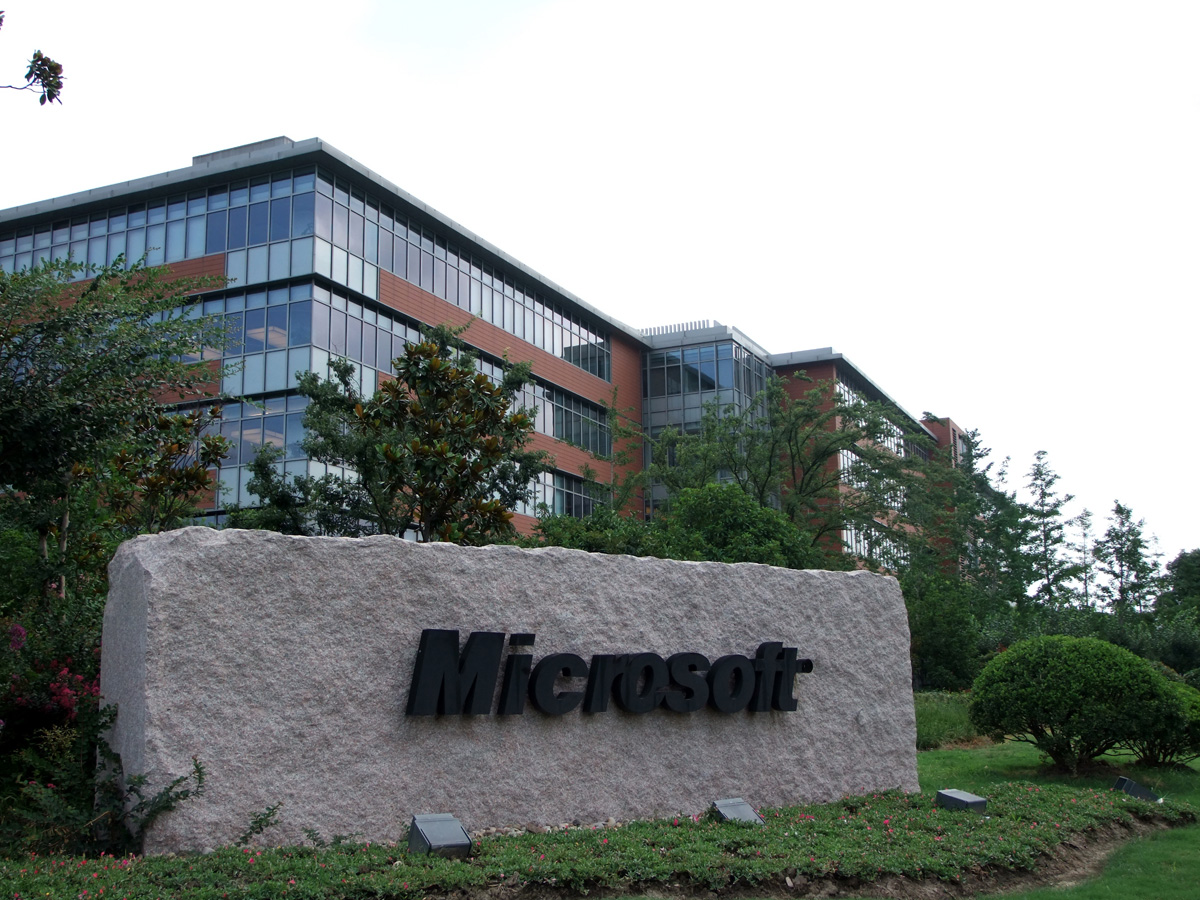
2009. Microsoft Zizhu Campus

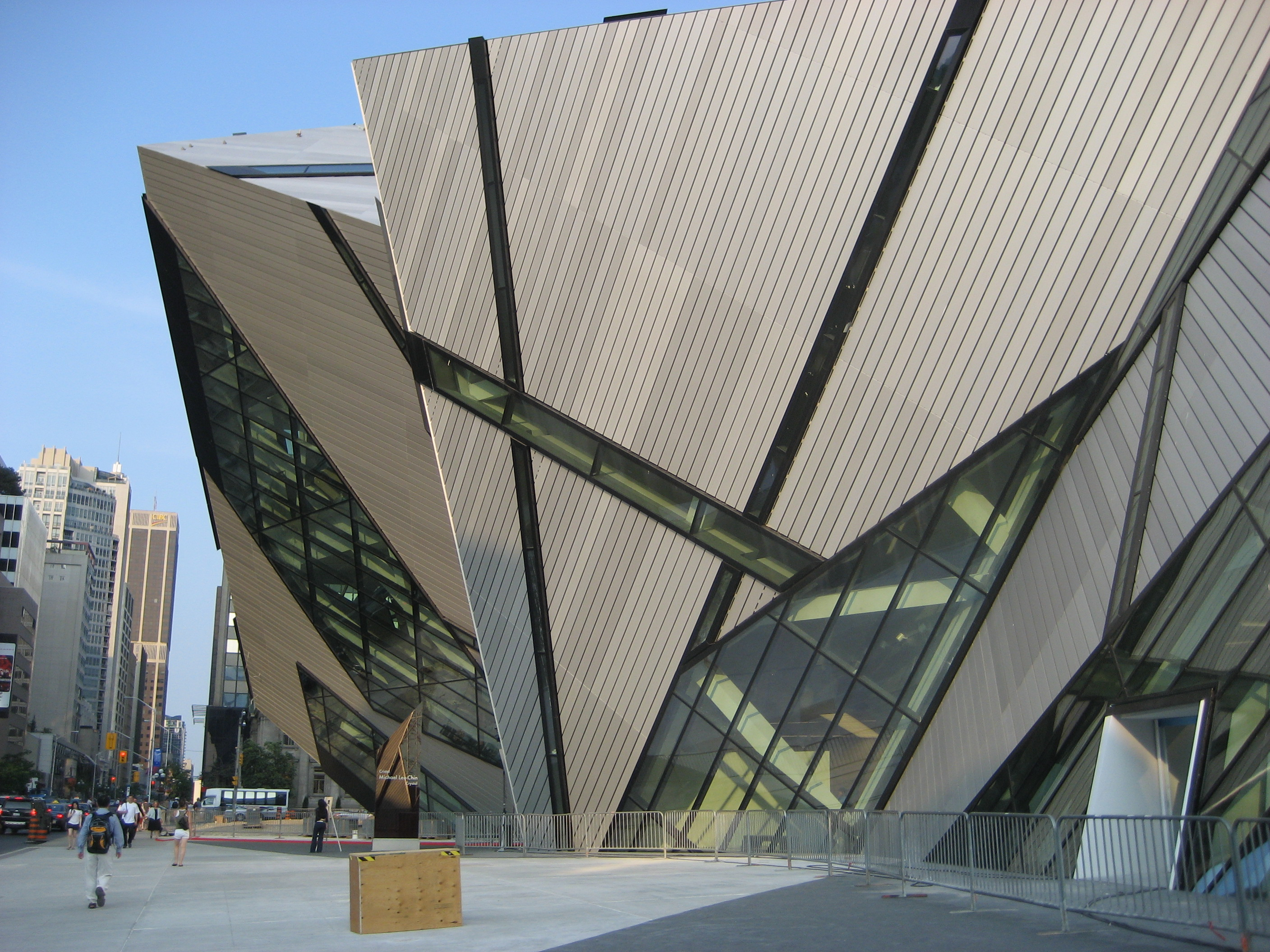
2007 Royal Ontario Museum, Toronto, Ontario.

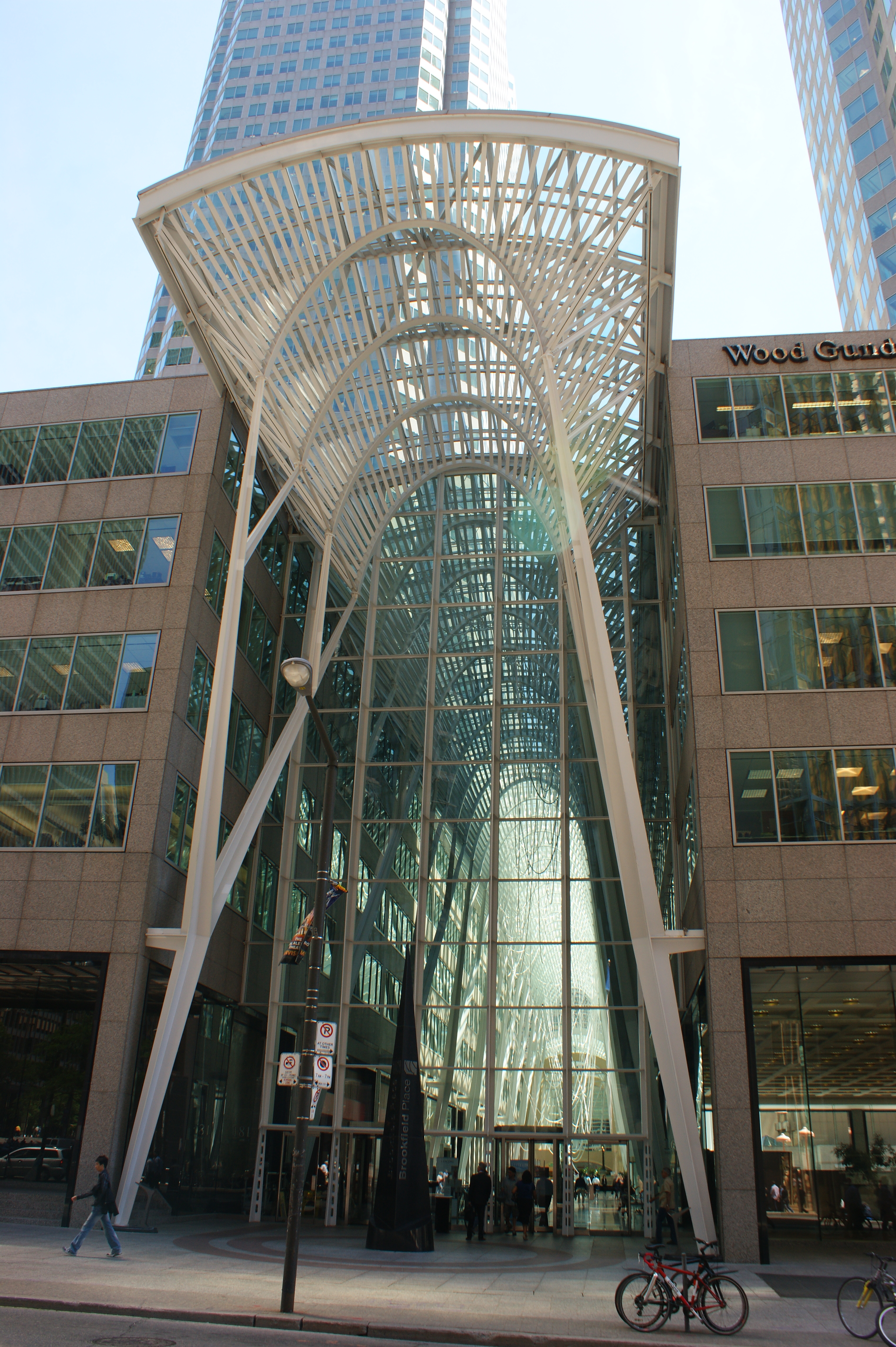
1992 Brookfield Place, Bay Street entrance. Toronto, Ontario.

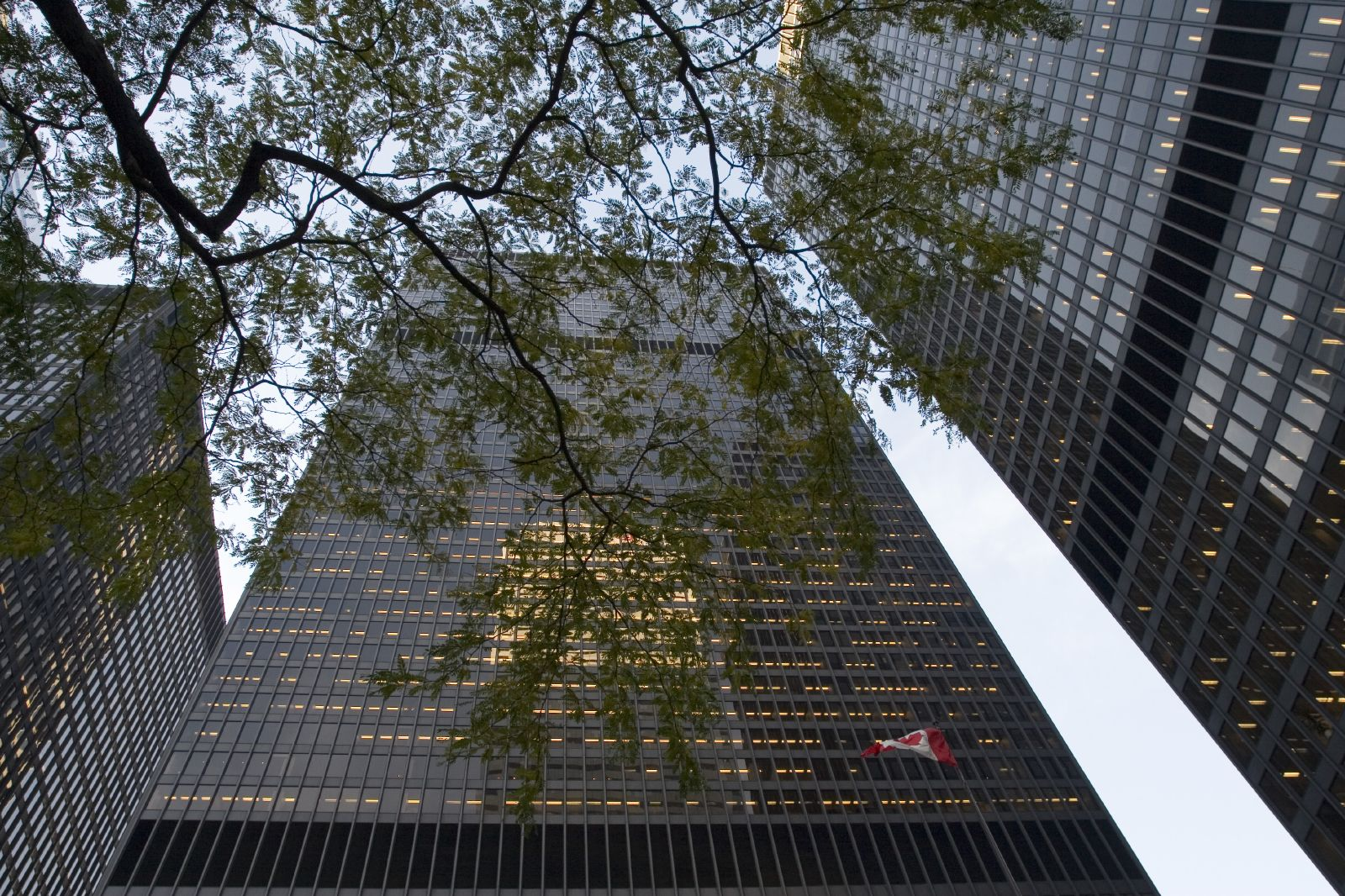
1991 Toronto Dominion Centre, Toronto, Ontario.

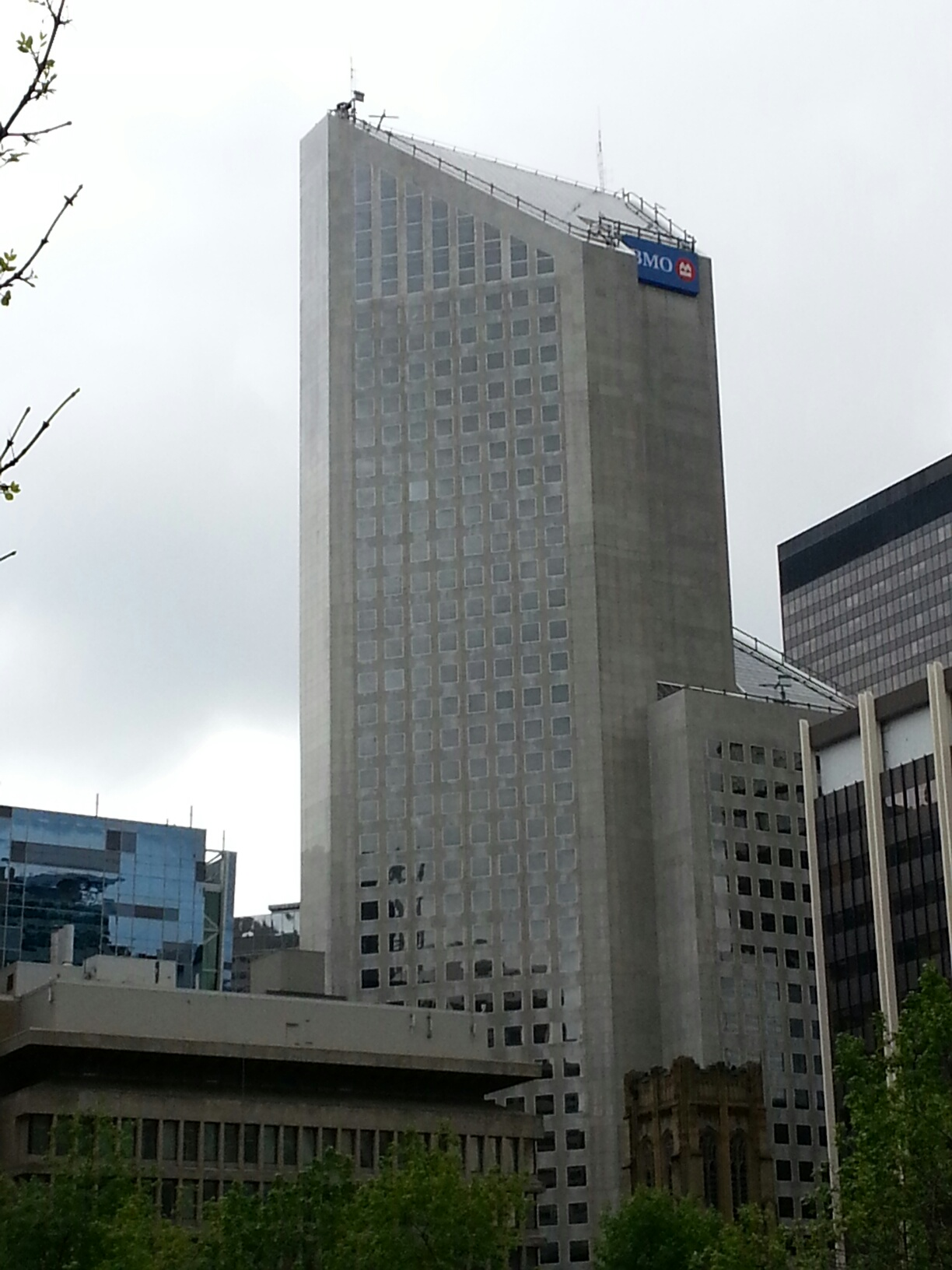
1982 First Canadian Centre, Calgary, Alberta.

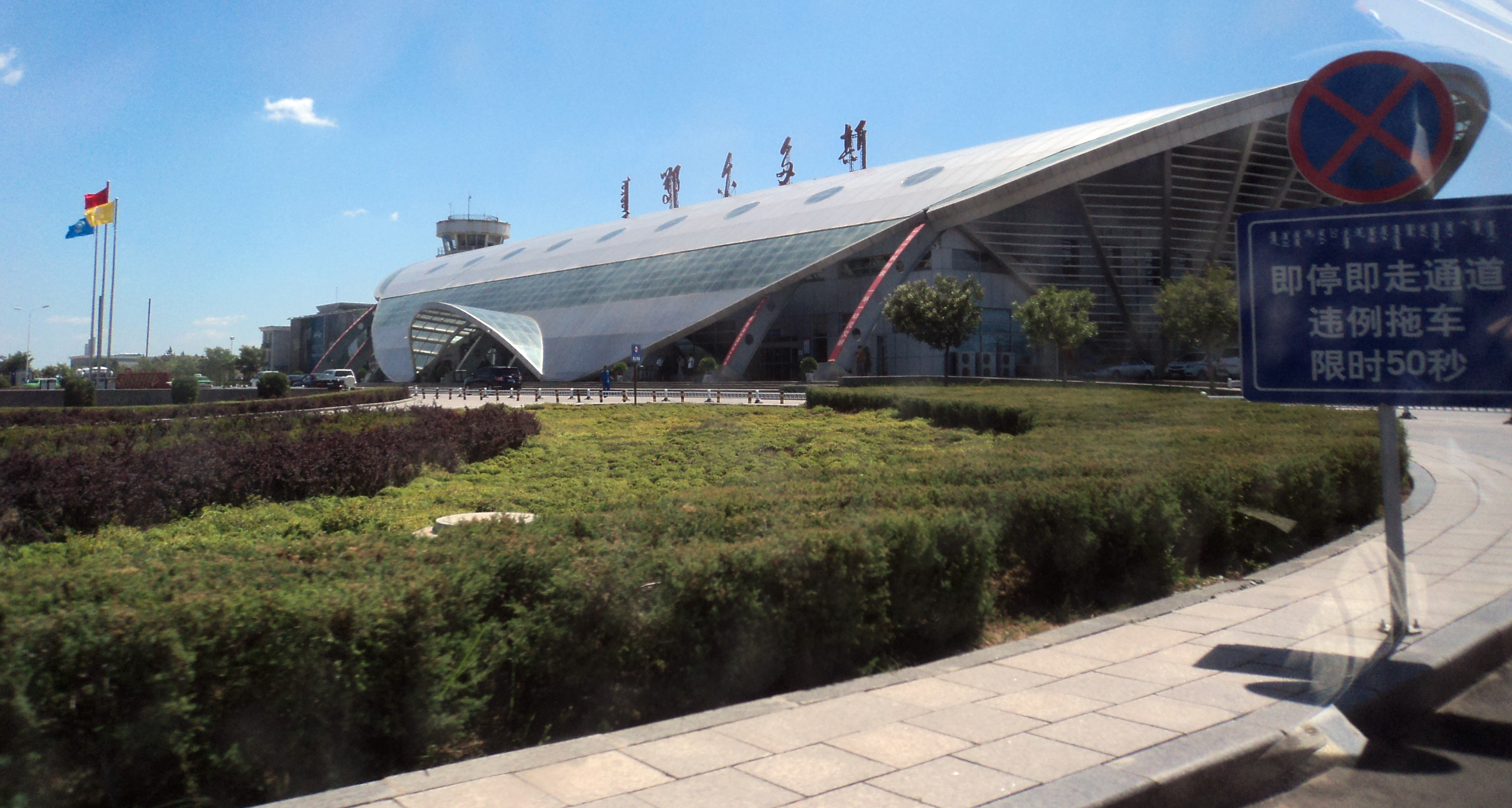
2013 Ordos Airport, China.

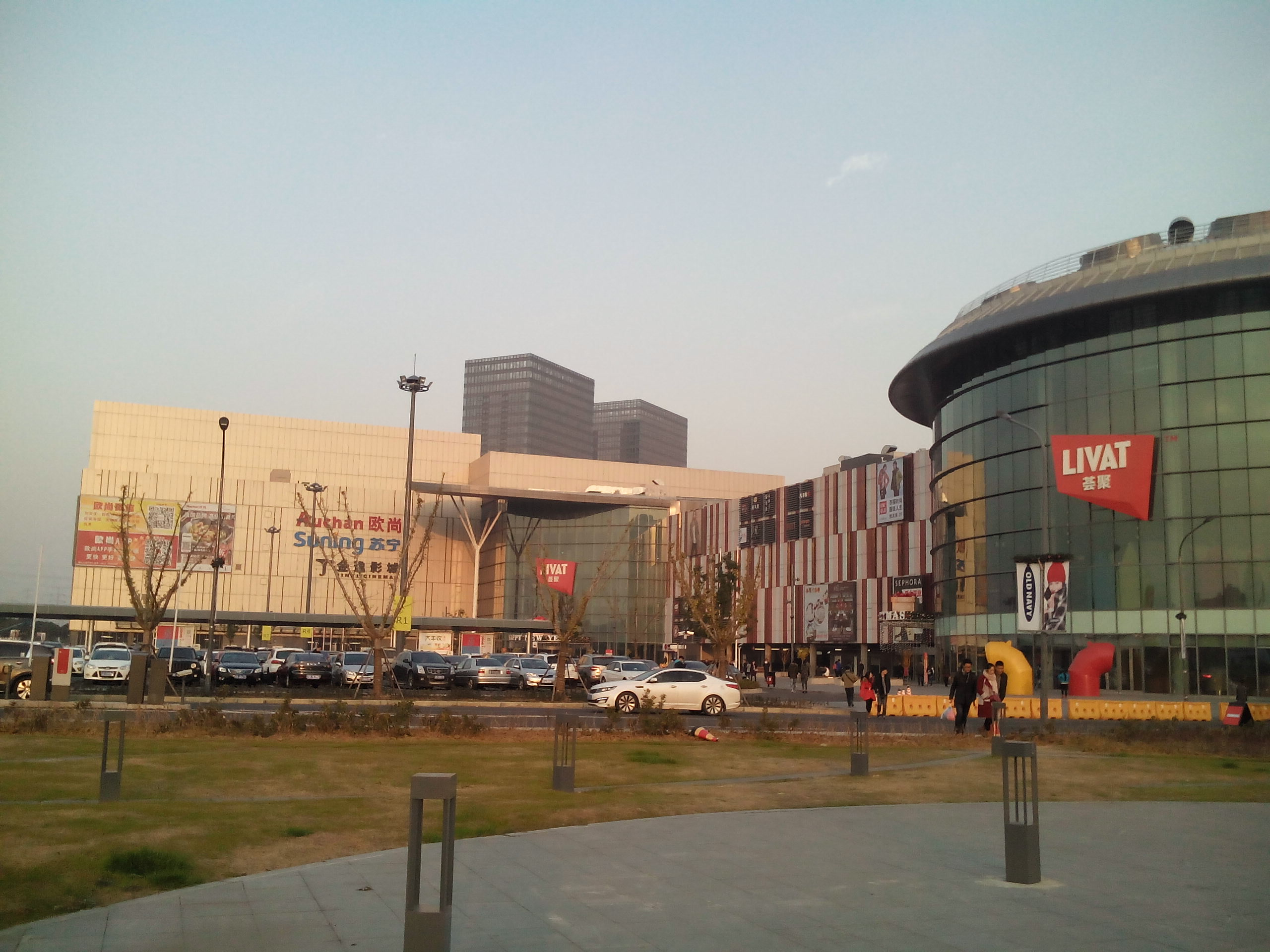
2014. LIVAT Wuxi Shopping Centre, China.

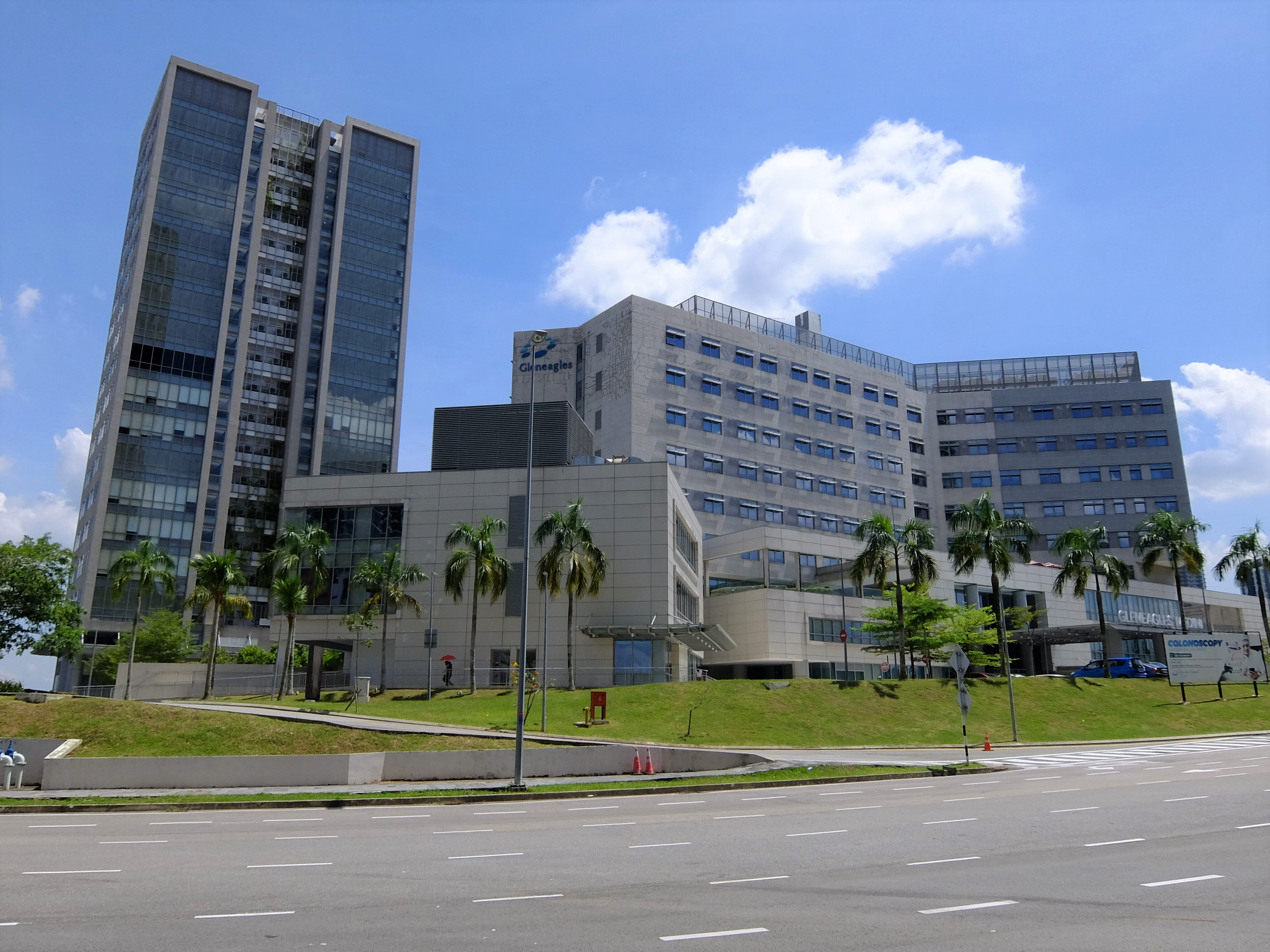
2015 Gleneagles Medini Hospital, Malaysia.

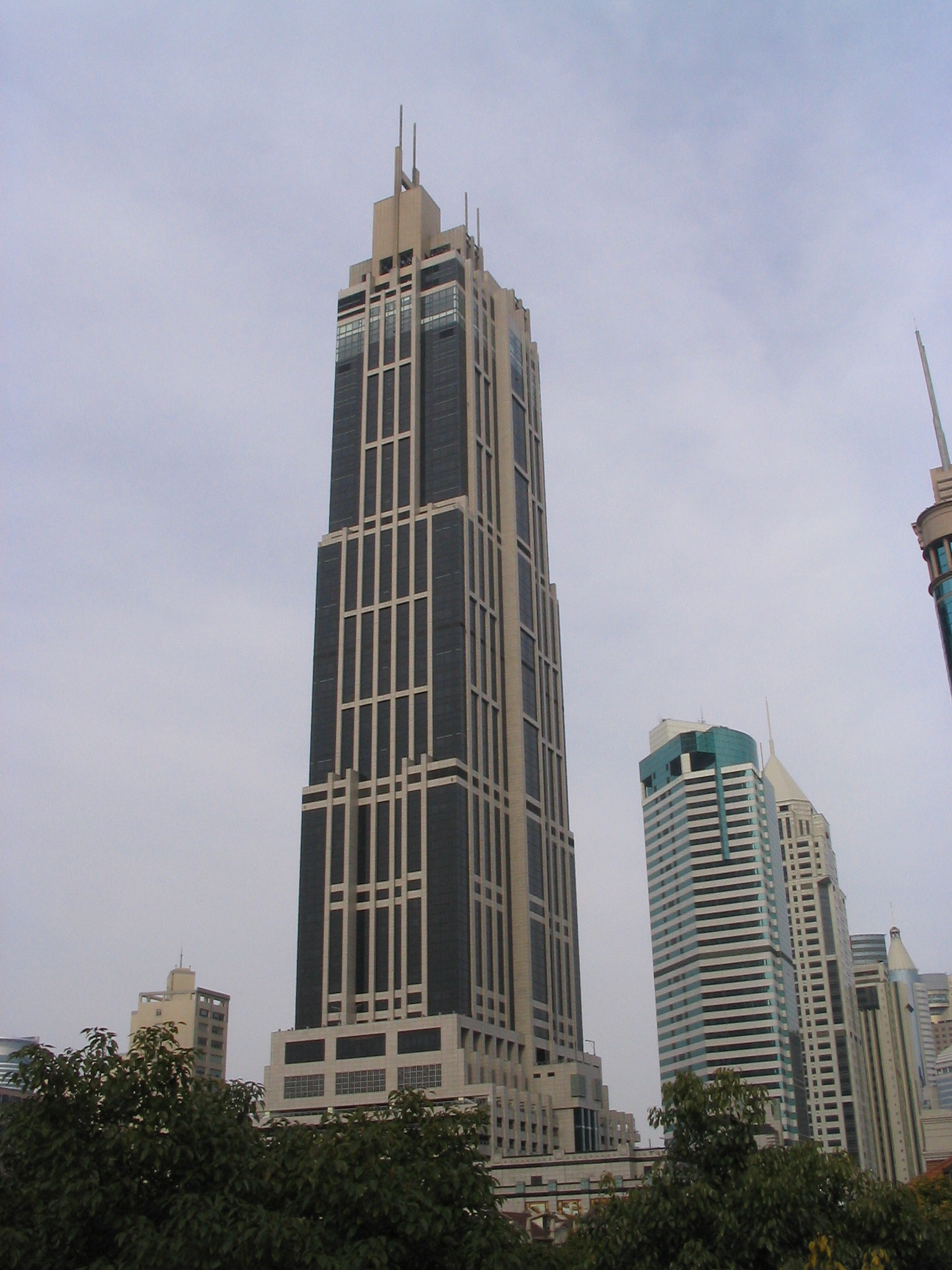
2002 Shanghai Hong Kong New World Tower.

== See also ==
- List of tallest buildings in Toronto
- List of tallest buildings in Canada
- Leadership in Energy and Environmental Design
