= The Pasture =

1985 public artwork by Joe Fafard

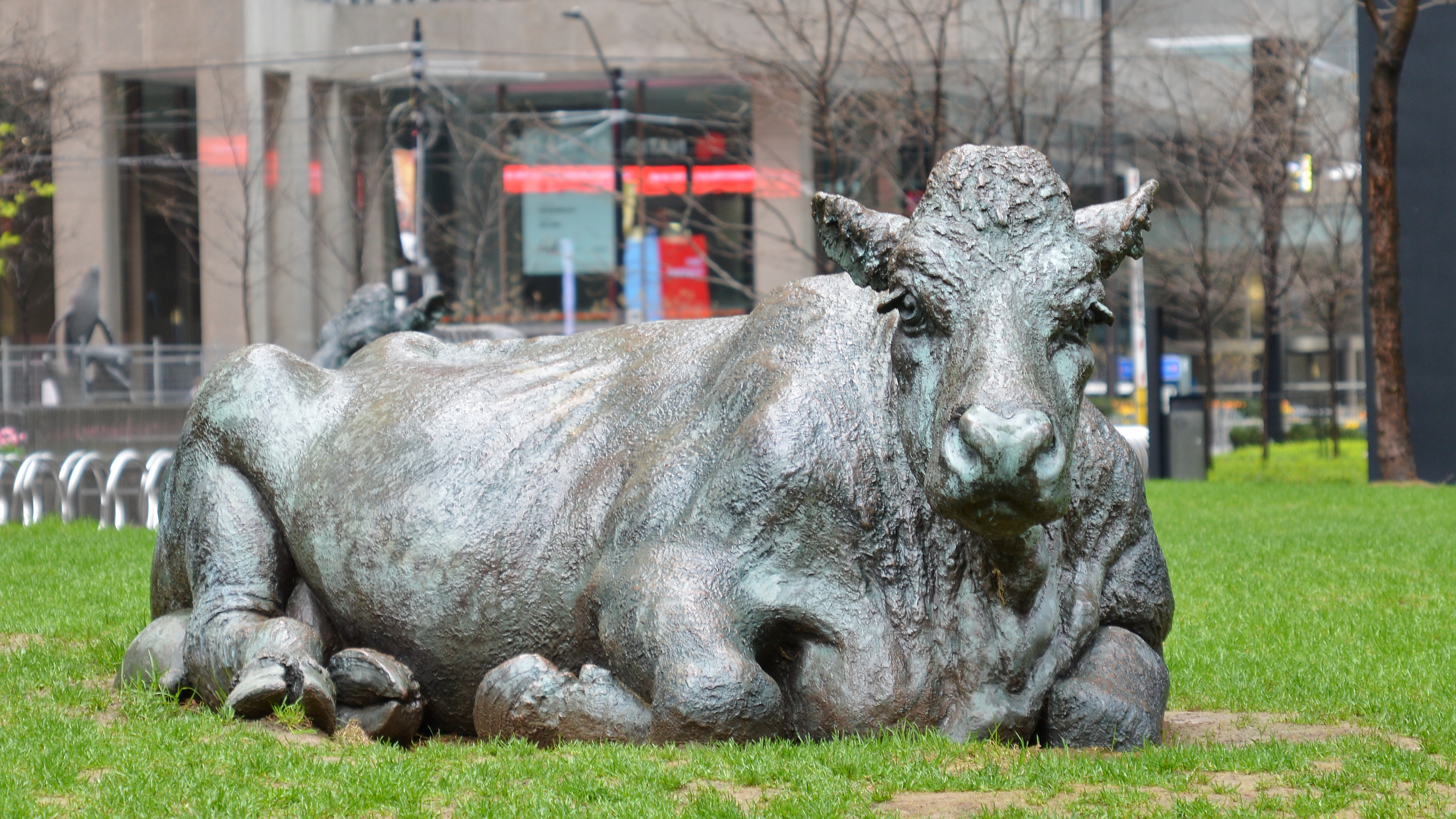
- One of the installation's seven bronze cows in 2019
- Artist: Joe Fafard
- Location: Toronto, Ontario, Canada
- 43°38′51″N 79°22′56″W

The Pasture is a 1985 public artwork by Canadian sculptor Joe Fafard, installed in Toronto's Toronto-Dominion Centre, in Ontario. The work features seven bronze cows with varying patinas.

Fafard, a recipient of the Order of Canada, was raised on a family farm and was of the view that artists should be inspired by their local environment. Cows were one of his better-known subjects.
