= Toronto-Dominion Centre =

Office complex in Toronto, Ontario

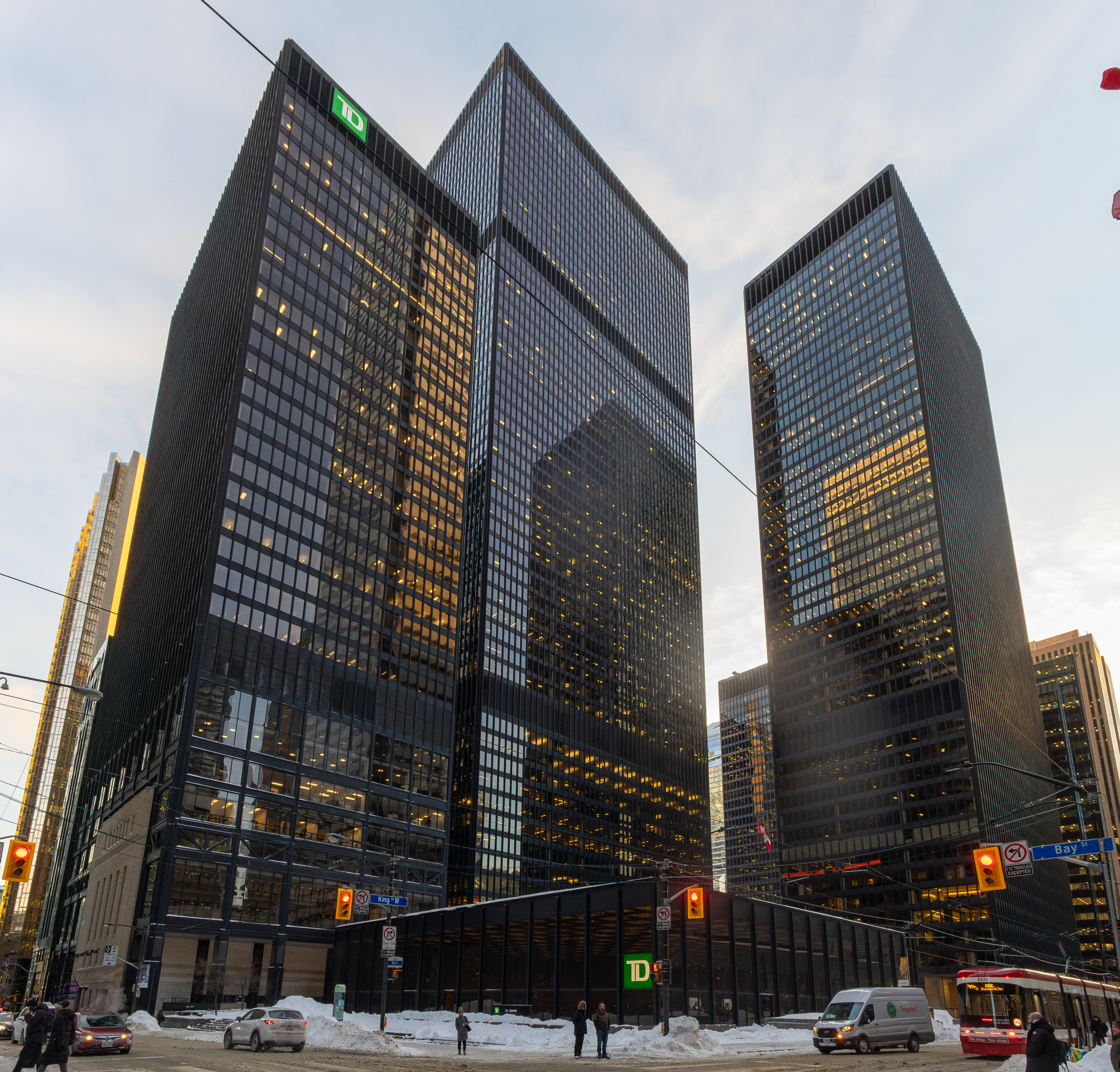
- The towers in 2026

General information
- Type: Commercial offices
- Location: King and Bay Street, Toronto, Canada
- Coordinates: 43.6479°N 79.3808°W
- Construction started: 1964
- Completed: 1969
- Owner: Cadillac Fairview
- Operator: Cadillac Fairview

Height
- Antenna spire: None
- Roof: 47–223 m (154–732 ft)
- Top floor: 56

Technical details
- Floor count: 22 to 56
- Lifts/elevators: TD Bank 32 and 2 freight TD North 24 and 2 freight TD West 10 and 2 freight TD South 16 and 1 freight EY 13 and 1 freight 95 Wellington 8 and 1 freight

Design and construction
- Architects: Ludwig Mies van der Rohe; John B. Parkin and Associates; Bregman + Hamann Architects
- Developer: Cadillac Fairview; Toronto Dominion Bank
- Main contractor: Pigott Construction

Ontario Heritage Act
- Designated: 2003

The Toronto-Dominion Centre, or TD Centre, is a skyscraper complex in the Financial District of downtown Toronto, Ontario, Canada. Owned by Cadillac Fairview, it is the global headquarters for its anchor tenant, the Toronto-Dominion Bank, and provides office and retail space for many other businesses. The complex consists of six towers and a pavilion covered in bronze-tinted glass and black-painted steel. Approximately 21,000 people work in the complex, making it the largest commercial office complex in Canada.

The project was the inspiration of Allen Lambert, former president and chairman of the board of the Toronto-Dominion Bank. Sister-in-law Phyllis Lambert recommended Ludwig Mies van der Rohe as design consultant to the architects, John B. Parkin and Associates and Bregman + Hamann, and the Fairview Corporation as the developer. The towers were completed between 1967 and 1991. An additional building was built outside the campus and purchased in 1998. As Mies was given "virtually a free hand to create Toronto-Dominion Centre", the complex, as a whole and in its details, is a classic example of his unique take on the International style and represents the end evolution of Mies's North American period.

== History ==
=== Background ===
After the 1955 merger of the Bank of Toronto and the Dominion Bank solidified in 1962, the Toronto-Dominion bank directors decided to commission a new headquarters to demonstrate the bank's emergence as a reputable national institution. Allen Lambert, past-president and chairman of the board of the Toronto-Dominion Bank, secured a cooperative partnership in the late 1950s with the Bronfman-owned developer, Fairview Corporation (now Cadillac Fairview); this marked a first for the development process in Canada, in that a bank, rather than creating its head office alone, had aligned itself with real estate interests and the city to influence urban space. The partnership was established as a 50–50 relationship, with the bank having the final say on the design of the complex and Phyllis Lambert—sister-in-law to Allen Lambert and a member of the Bronfman family—was called in as an advisor on the TD Centre competition. Gordon Bunshaft, then chief designer of Skidmore, Owings and Merrill, was hired by the consortium. His proposal called for exterior structural supports for the main office tower, which then necessitated piston-like slip joints at the roof level to deal with weather-related expansion and contraction of the structure. Phyllis Lambert objected to this submission, later stating in an interview that it "was a ridiculous proposal on many levels.... Even in a milder climate, it would have been problematic." Bunshaft, due to his refusal to redesign, was relieved of his commission.

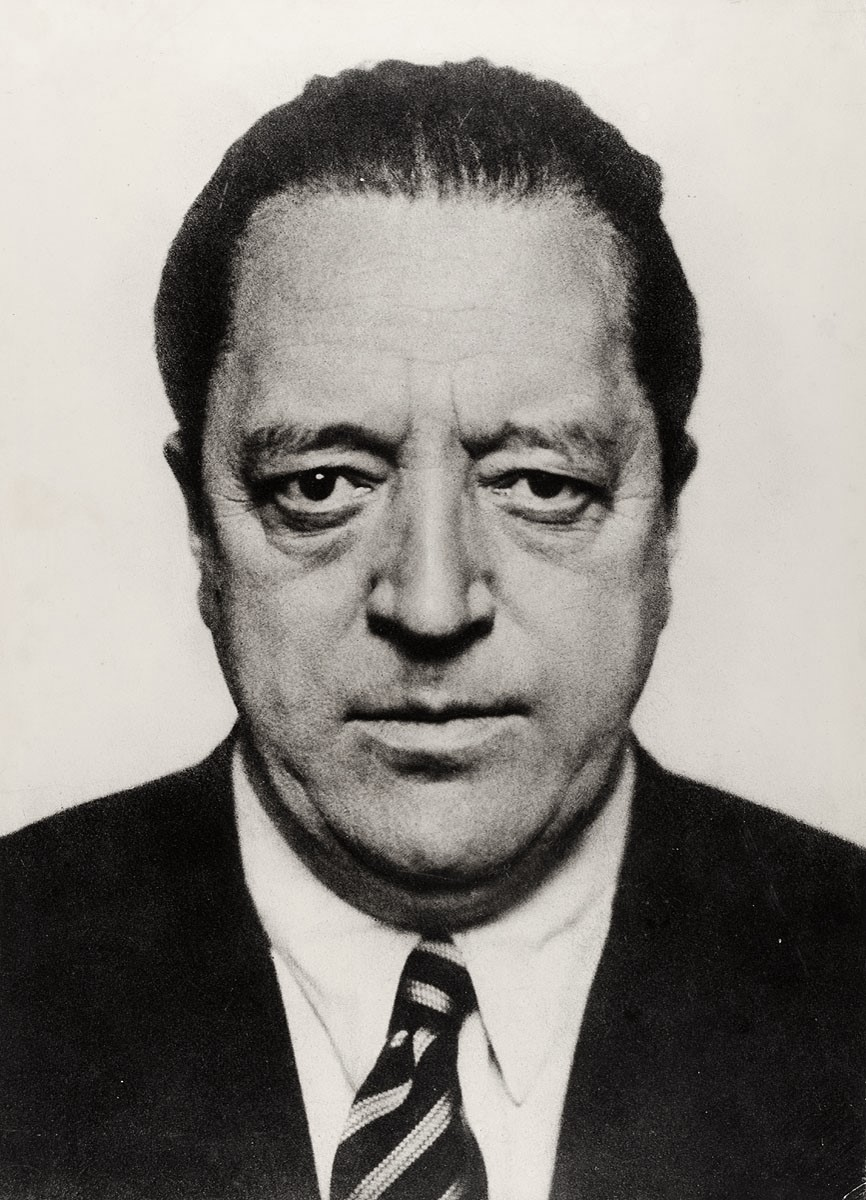
Ludwig Mies van der Rohe, the design architect for the Toronto-Dominion Centre

This left John Parkin, the local architect who would have worked with the American Bunshaft, to design Toronto-Dominion Centre. His firm put forward a model showing a 100-storey, all-concrete tower—to be the largest in the Commonwealth—standing over a plaza with a sunken courtyard containing a circular banking pavilion. It was at this point that Phyllis Lambert insisted that Ludwig Mies van der Rohe (whom she knew from having been the director of planning on his Seagram Building) be called for an interview. Mies was unimpressed by Parkin's concept and wondered why one would design a building to be entered through its basement. With this, the Parkin proposal was scrapped and Allen Lambert was convinced to bring Mies on board. Though he was technically commissioned as the design consultant to the local architects (who were still John B. Parkin and Associates, but partnered with Bregman + Hamann Architects), the project was essentially Mies's design in its entirety, demonstrating all the key characteristics of the architect's unique style.

The choice of Mies and his design gave the project the added significance of being a symbol of Toronto's emergence as a major city. It also marked Mies's last major work before his death in 1969. This followed the precedent set by the previous incarnation of the Toronto-Dominion Bank: the Bank of Toronto's 1862 office at Wellington and Church Streets had been designed by William Kauffman and its 1913 Beaux-Arts headquarters were conceived by Carrère and Hastings. Both firms were the most renowned and respected architects of their times.

=== Construction ===
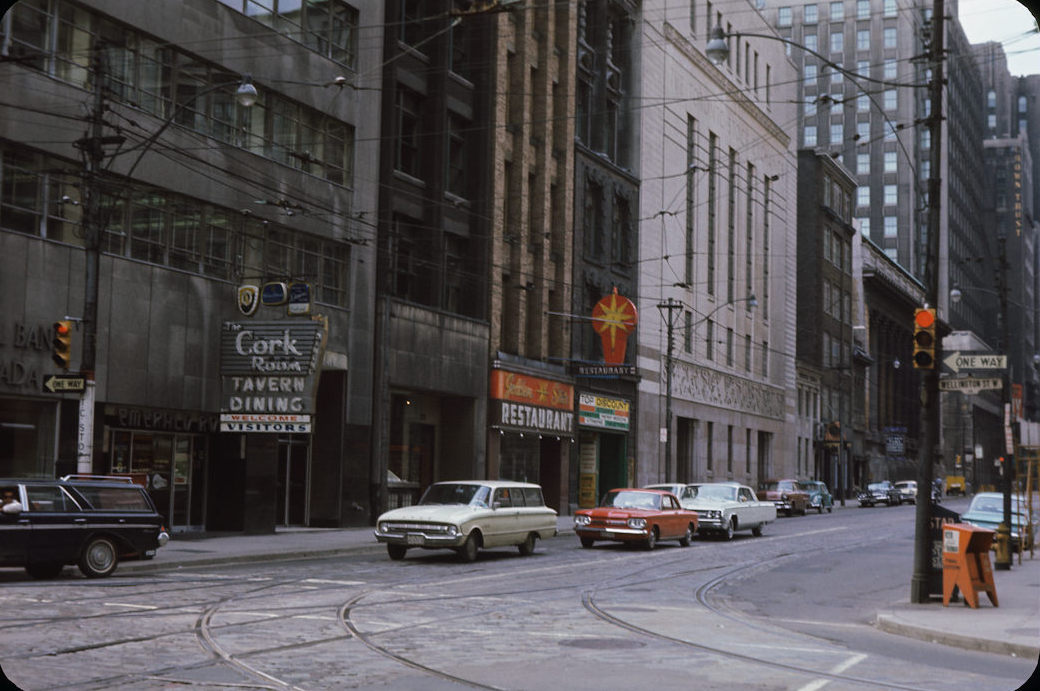
Bay and Wellington Street in 1966. Nearly all the buildings were later demolished to make way for Exchange Place.

The development of the TD Centre required Fairview to acquire a full city block of downtown Toronto, except for some frontages on Bay Street and at the corner of King and York Streets. Among notable losses from the subsequent demolition were the Rossin House Hotel, which dated to the 1850s and was once one of the city's preeminent hotels. The Carrère and Hastings Bank of Toronto headquarters, at the southwest corner of King and Bay Streets, was also razed despite protests urging that the Beaux-Arts building be incorporated into the new centre. Fairview officials brushed these aside and said that it "did not fit in". Elements of the old edifice can still be found as relics in Guild Park and Gardens, in Scarborough.

The first structure completed was the Toronto-Dominion Bank Tower (now the TD Bank Tower) in 1967. Though the complex remained unfinished, the official opening took place on 16 May of that year to coincide with the Canadian Centennial celebrations, with Princess Alexandra, The Honourable Lady Ogilvy, presiding, accompanied by her husband, Sir Angus Ogilvy.

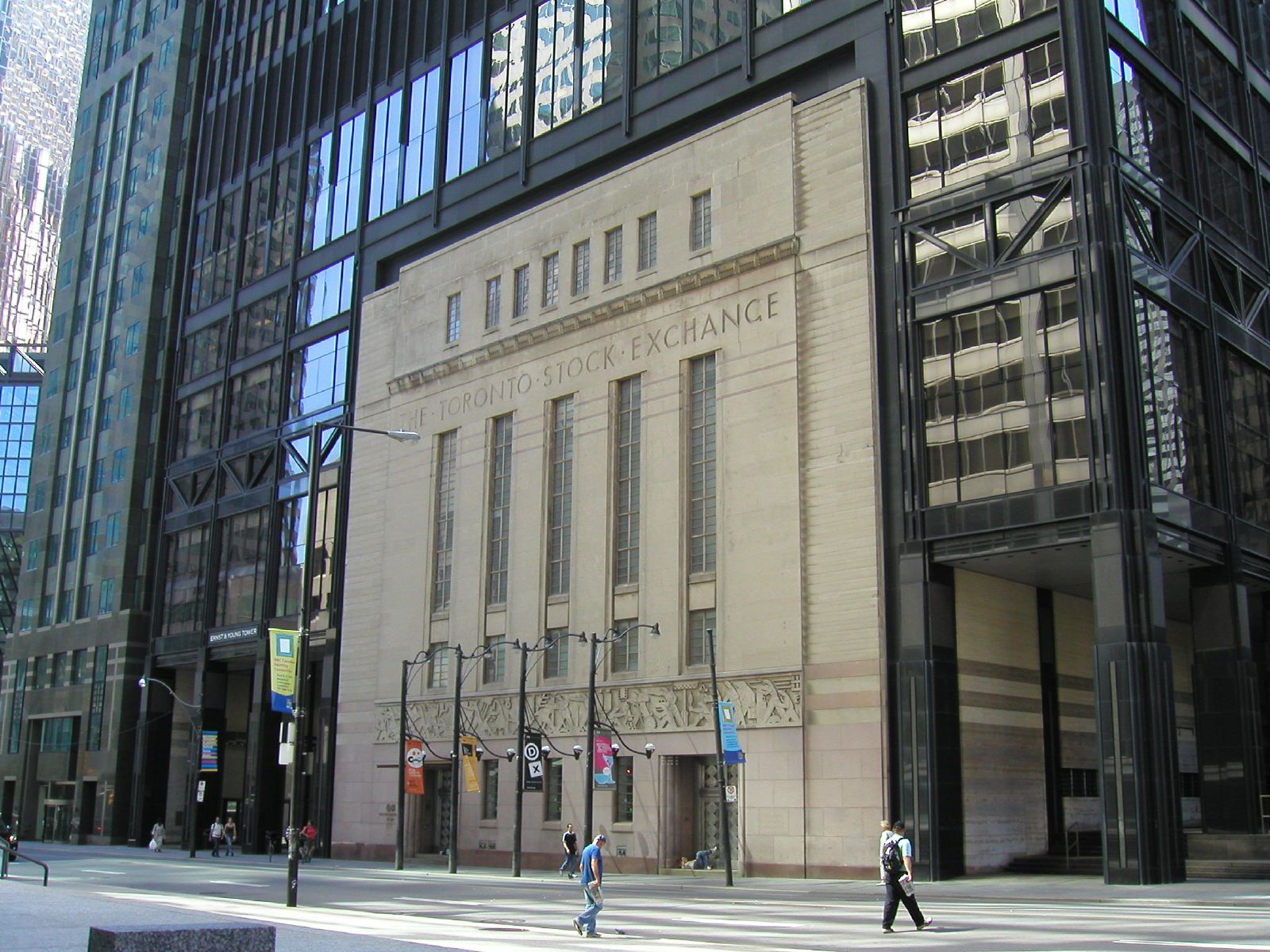
The former Toronto Stock Exchange building built into the base of 222 Bay Street

At 222.8 m (731 ft), the tower was the tallest building in Canada when completed. The completion of the banking pavilion and the Royal Trust Tower (now the TD North Tower) followed in 1968 and 1969, respectively. The Commercial Union Tower (now the TD West Tower) was added in 1974 and was the first on the site not conceived by Mies in his plan. It was followed by the IBM Tower (now the TD South Tower), built south of Wellington Street across from the original campus in 1985. The 23-storey building at 95 Wellington Street was completed in 1987 and contains 330,000 sq ft (31,000 m^{2}). Cadillac Fairview acquired it in 1998 and incorporated it into Toronto-Dominion Centre. Finally with little available space left on or near the block, the final building—the Ernst & Young Tower (now 222 Bay Street)—was constructed in 1992 over the existing 1930s Toronto Stock Exchange.

=== Late 20th century ===
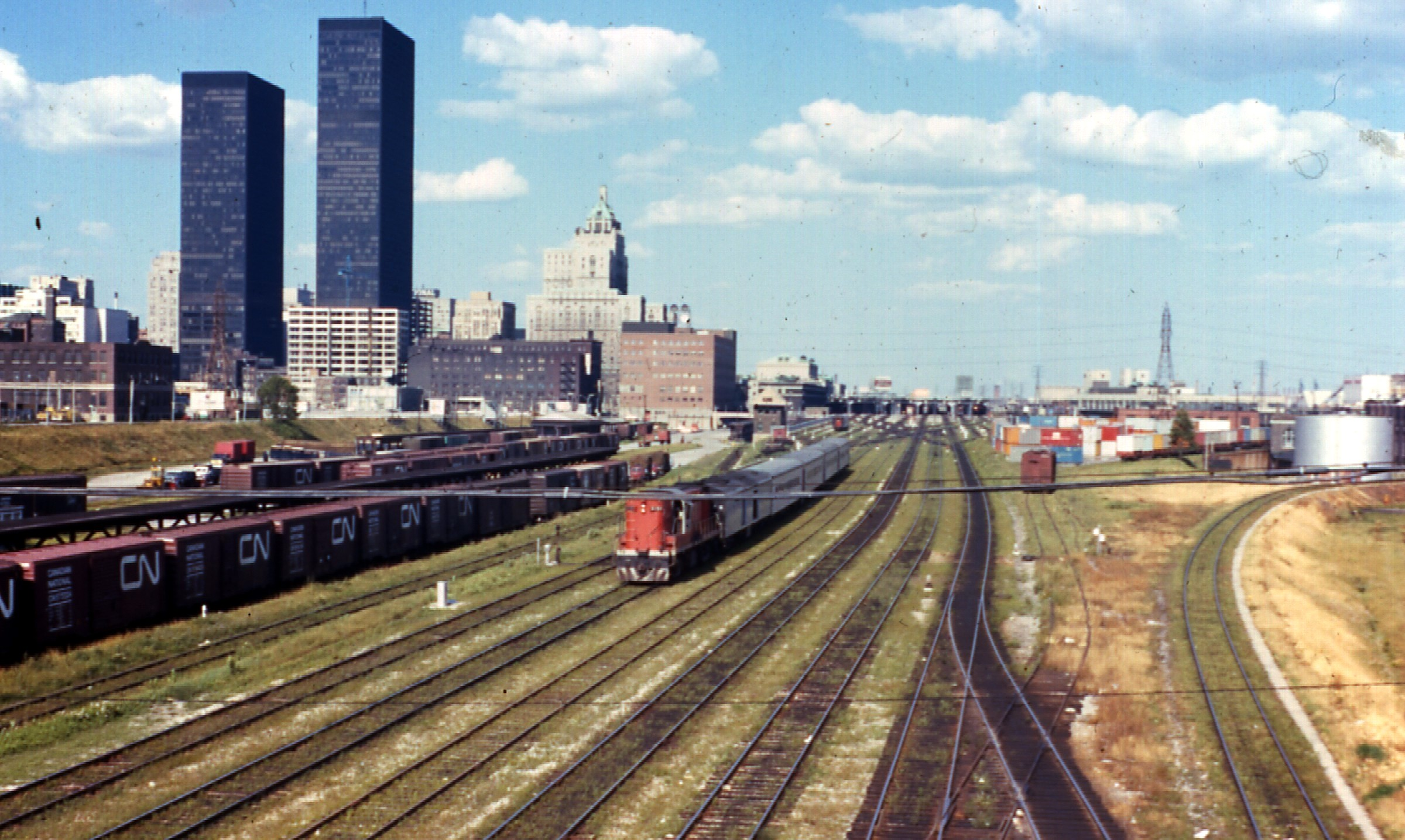
Downtown Toronto skyline in 1970, dominated by the first two towers

From November 27–30, 1967, the 54th floor of the newly finished Toronto-Dominion Bank Tower was the venue of the centennial year Confederation of Tomorrow conference, a summit of provincial premiers (except for W.A.C. Bennett) convened by Ontario Premier John Robarts. It was an unsuccessful attempt to achieve a provincial agreement for amendments to the constitution of Canada proposed by Prime Minister Lester B. Pearson.

In 1993, Garry Hoy, a 39-year-old lawyer of Holden Day Wilson, plunged 24 floors to his death after repeatedly charging a window while attempting to demonstrate its strength to a group of visiting law students.

=== 21st century ===
Prince Edward, his wife, Sophie, Countess of Wessex, and former Lieutenant Governor Lincoln Alexander unveil an Ontario Heritage Trust plaque in 2006

The original three buildings and the plazas of Toronto–Dominion Centre were together recognized as a part of Ontario's built heritage in 2005, when an Ontario Heritage Trust plaque was unveiled by Prince Edward, Earl of Wessex, his wife, Sophie, Countess of Wessex, and former lieutenant governor of Ontario Lincoln Alexander. The complex has been designated under Part IV of the Ontario Heritage Act since 2003. The designation notes "The Toronto-Dominion Centre is an outstanding example of the International Style of architecture." The concrete foundations, the load-bearing black-painted steel frames, the bronze-tinted glass curtain walls with mullions and a grid of exposed and painted steel I-beams, the revolving doors at the bases and, on the towers, the pilotis, are noted architectural features on the exterior of the buildings. Inside, "the interior finishes (granite, marble, travertine, and oak) and custom-built fittings in the Banking Pavilion, in the lobbies of the Toronto-Dominion Bank Tower and the Royal Trust Tower" are recognized heritage attributes.

In 2007, the Royal Architectural Institute of Canada declared the TD Centre a masterpiece of the twentieth century.

In May 2017, to mark the 50th anniversary of the complex and Canada's 150th birthday, the buildings became the canvas of an art exhibition by Montreal artist Aude Moreau in which the buildings were used as a canvas to spell out “LESS IS MORE OR,” a take on Mies van der Rohe's famous expression. While this type of installation had been done elsewhere, this was the largest undertaking of its kind in the world.

== Site ==
As with the Seagram Building and a number of Mies's subsequent projects, the Toronto-Dominion Centre follows the theme of the darkly coloured, steel and glass edifice set in an open plaza, itself surrounded by a dense and erratic, pre-existing urban fabric. The TD Centre, however, comprises a collection of structures spread across a granite plinth, all regulated in three dimensions and from the largest scale to the smallest, by a mathematically ordered, 1.5 m^{2} (16 sq ft) grid.

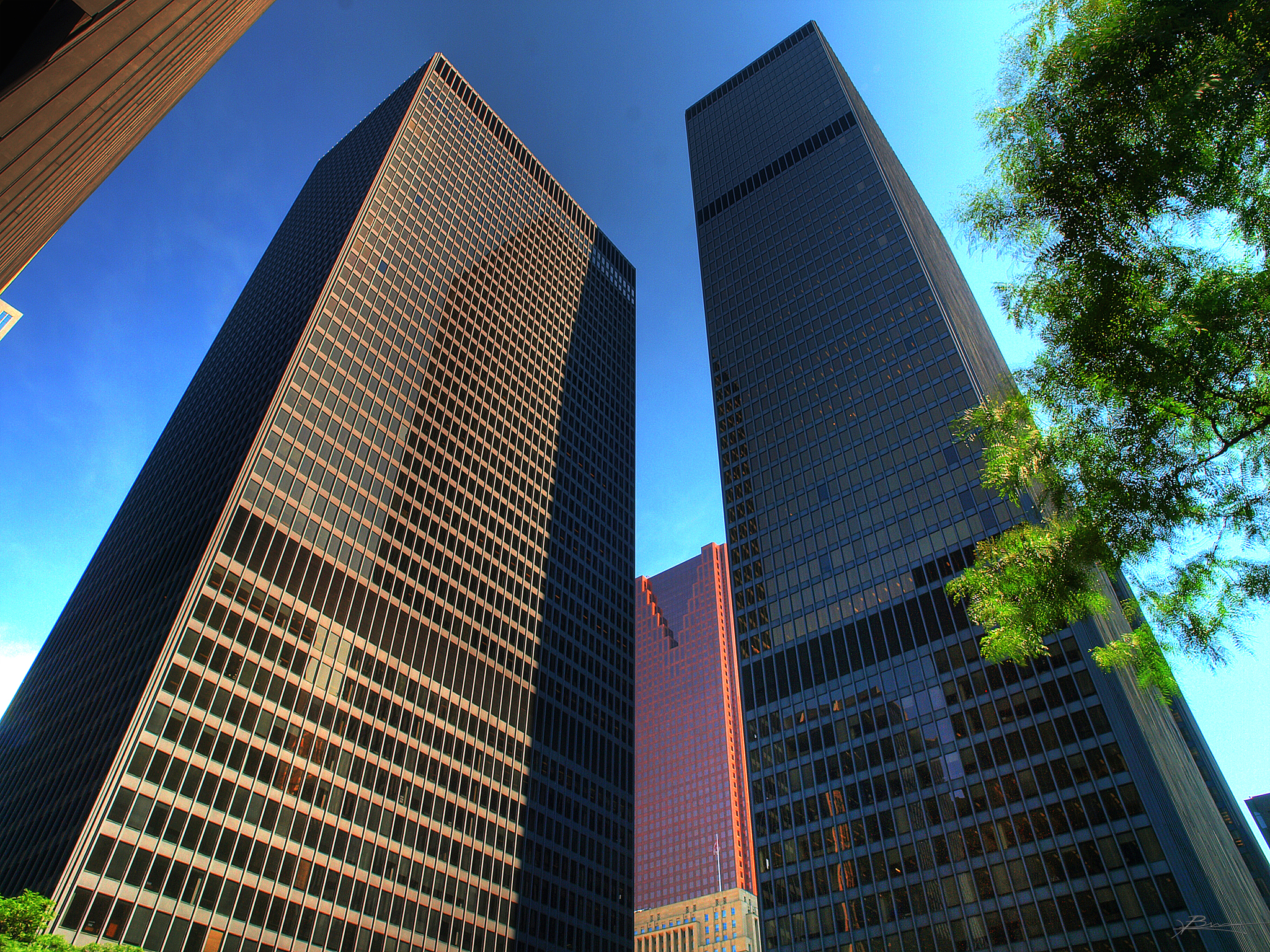
Towers at Exchange Place are offset from one another, allowing people moving across its courtyard to have a "sliding view" of the area. Scotia Plaza is visible in the background.

Three structures were conceived: a low banking pavilion anchoring the site at the corner of King and Bay Streets, the main tower in the centre of the site, and another tower in the northwest corner, each structure offset to the adjacent by one bay of the governing grid, allowing views to 'slide' open or closed as an observer moves across the court. The rectilinear pattern of Saint-Jean granite pavers follows the grid, serving to organize and unify the complex, and the plaza's surface material extends through the glass lobbies of the towers and the banking pavilion, blurring the distinction between interior and exterior space. The remaining voids between the buildings create space for the plaza and lawn.

Phyllis Lambert wrote of the centre and the arrangement of its elements within the site:

With the Toronto-Dominion Centre, Mies realized an architecture of movement, and yet at the same time, through proportional relations among parts and whole, and through the restrained use of fine materials, this is also an architecture of repose. The light as it moves across the building surfaces, playing the mullions like stringed instruments, and the orchestration of the various buildings are together paradigmatically symphonic.

More towers were added over the ensuing decades, outside the periphery of the original site—as they were not part of Mies's master plan for the TD Centre—but still positioned close enough, and in such locations, as to visually impact the sense of space within areas of the centre, forming Miesian western and southern walls to the lawn and a tall eastern flank to the plaza.

=== Pavilion ===
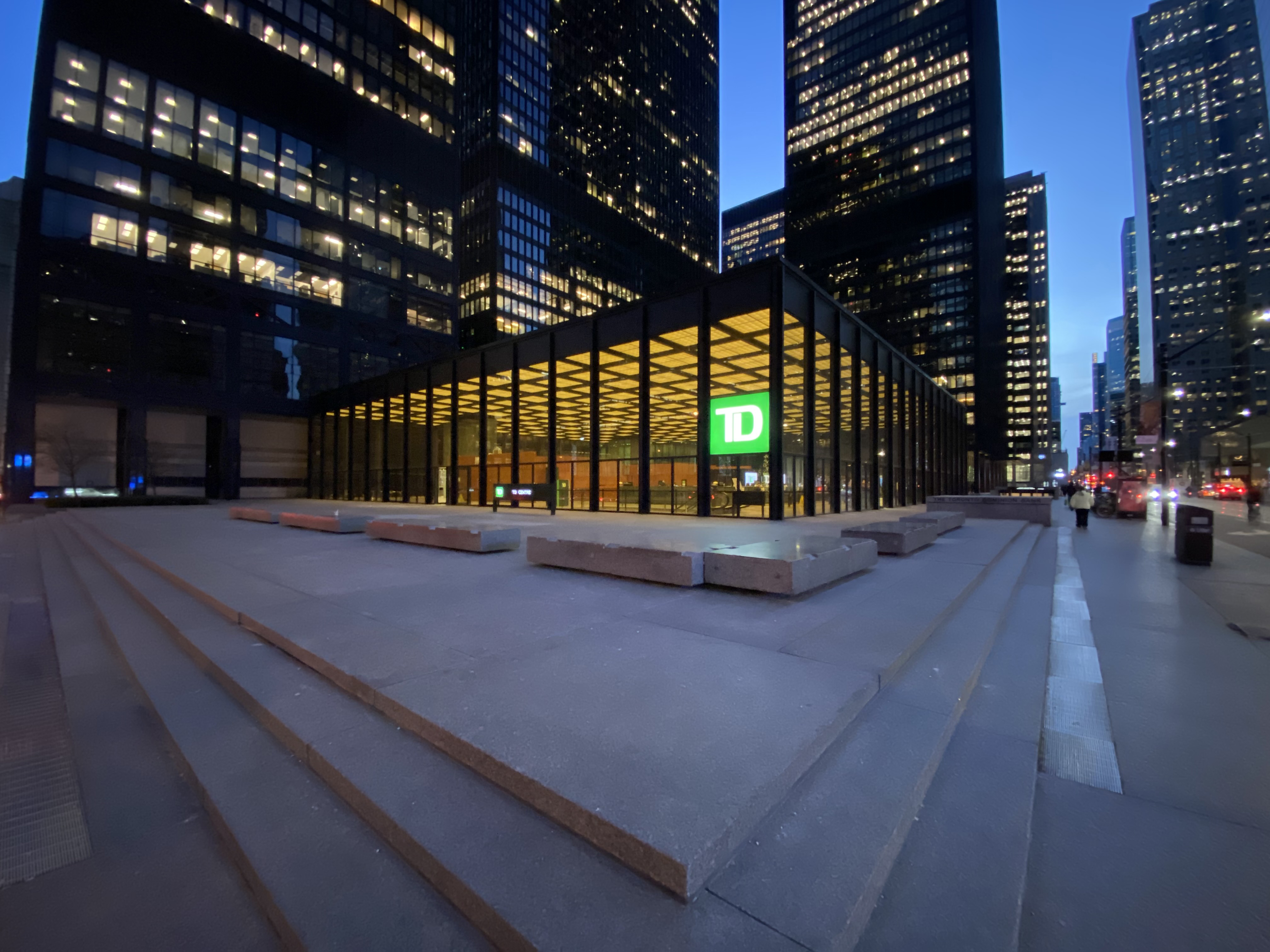
The banking pavilion from across Bay Street looking west

The banking pavilion is a double-height structure housing the main branch of the bank. It contains fifteen 22.9 m^{2} (246 sq ft) modules within a single interior space, with smaller areas inside the pavilion cordoned off using counters and cabinets, all built with the typical rich materials of Mies's palette—marble, English oak, and granite. The roof of the building is made of deep steel I-sections, each beam supported on only one steel I-section column at each end, all combined to create a waffle-grid ceiling resting on a row of corresponding, equally spaced columns around the periphery. This structure was both a further development on the post office pavilion of the Federal Center in Chicago—which has fewer expressed columns and a second level balcony—and a precursor to the Neue Nationalgalerie completed in Berlin in 1968—which had a similar roof supported on only eight large steel columns. The TD Centre pavilion was described by The Globe and Mail as "among the best spaces Mies ever made".

The banking pavilion's living roof was installed as part of Cadillac Fairview's goal of having the entire complex LEED-certified by 2013. It is intended to help protect the building from solar heat gain, reduce storm runoff, and contributes to air quality.

==== TD Conference Centre ====
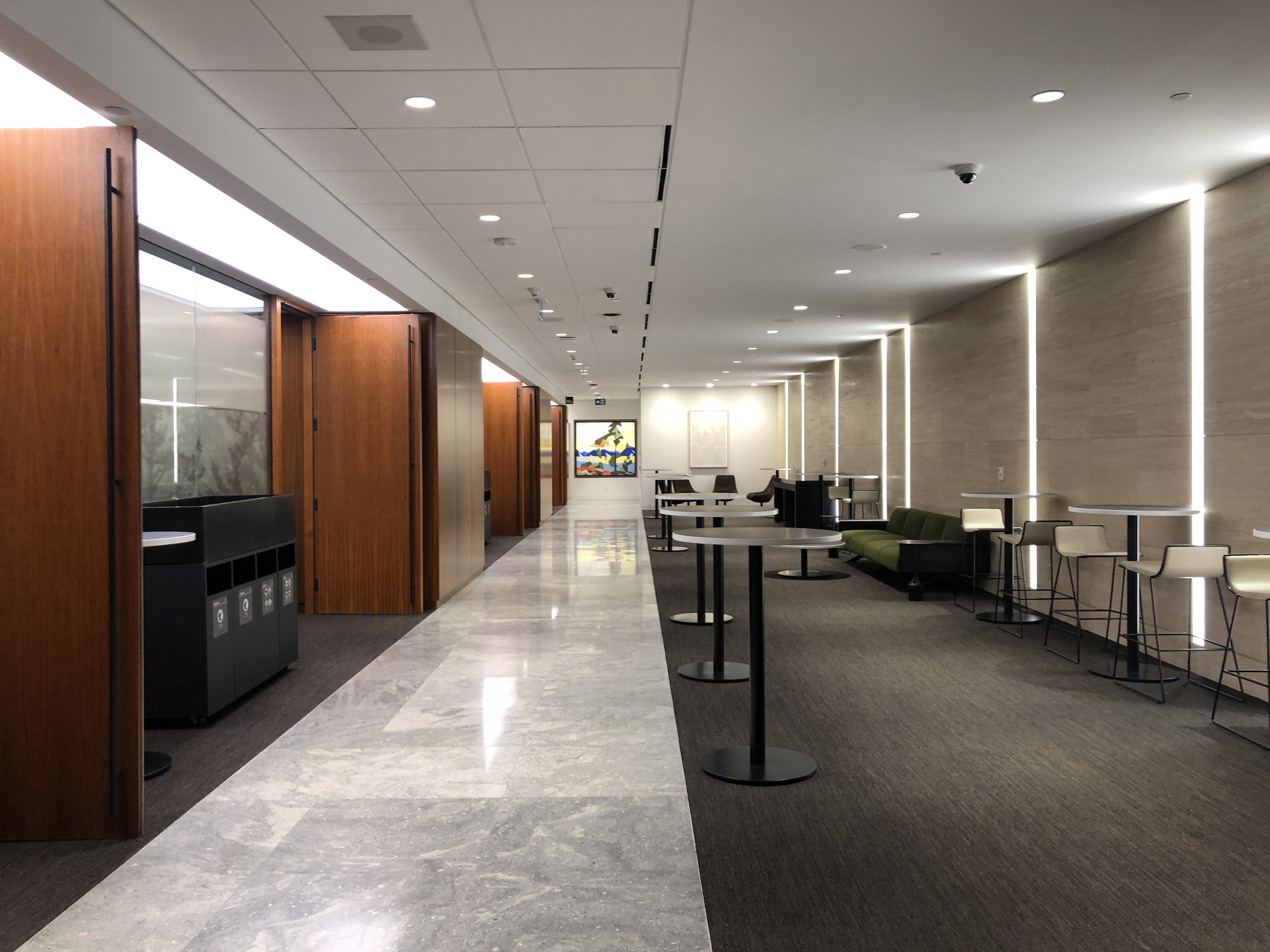
The lower level of the TD Conference Centre

The area below the Pavilion serves as the TD Bank Conference Centre, completed in 2018.

The space was originally home to a 690-seat Famous Players movie theatre, which would prove to be one of the most fertile palettes for Mies's minimalist aesthetic. The first screenings were Wait Until Dark and Reflections in a Golden Eye. The cinema was used for gala events such as the Canadian Film Awards, now the Canadian Screen Awards, and the Toronto International Film Festival. The theatre operated for approximately one decade until, in 1978, the space was repurposed in light of the proliferation of multiplexes throughout the city. The space was used for offices and storage until its eventual transformation into a conference centre.

=== Public space ===
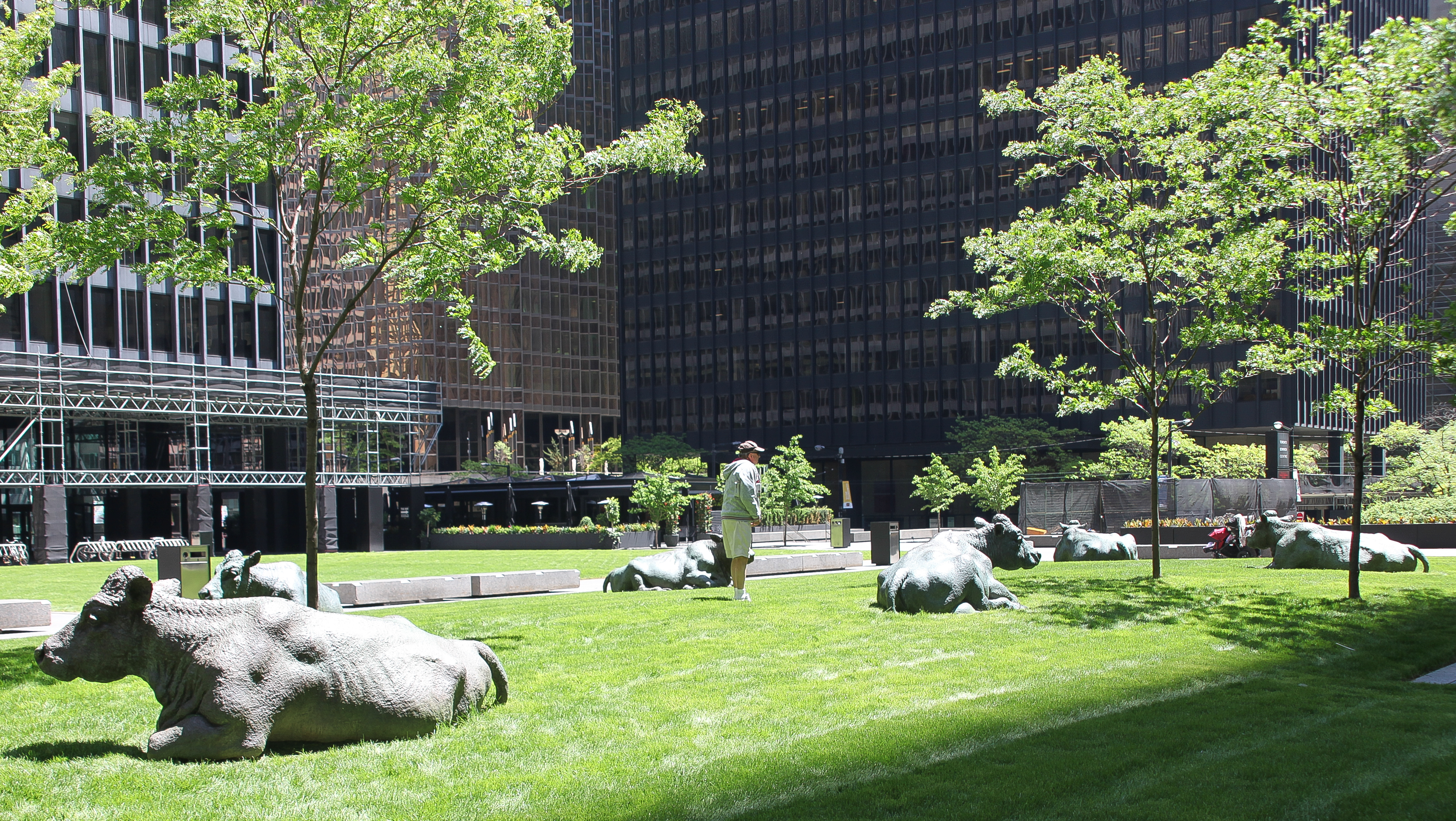
The Pasture by Joe Fafard on display at the complex's public square

Between the towers are two large expanses, collectively known as Oscar Peterson Place. The northern space is paved in granite, while the southern space contains the lawn and features The Pasture, a sculpture by Saskatchewan artist Joe Fafard, who died in early 2019. In addition to serving as sanctuaries for building occupants, the plazas have hosted events spanning music, athletics, entertainment and fundraising. The plazas were the first examples of privately provided large-scale public outdoor spaces within the urban core of Toronto. The space was named as part of the Toronto Legacy Project; Montreal-born jazz legend Oscar Peterson was on-hand for the ceremony.

=== Towers ===
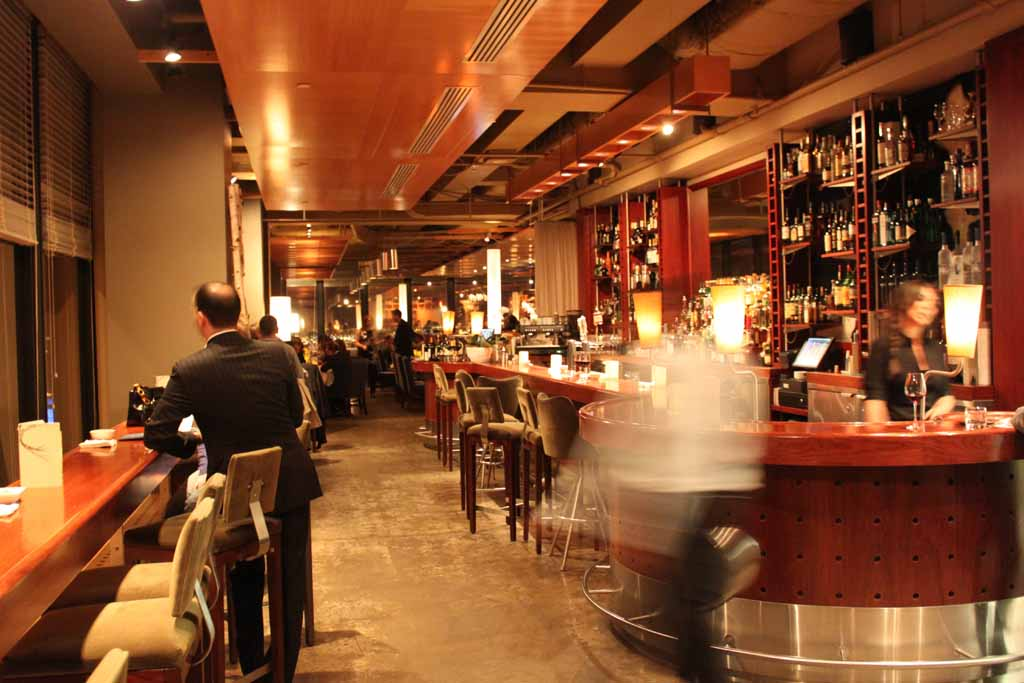
Canoe Restaurant in 54th floor

The height of each of Mies's two towers is proportioned to its width and depth. All, save for 95 Wellington Street West, are of similar construction and appearance: the frame is of structural steel, including the core (containing elevators, stairs, washrooms, and other service spaces), and floor plates are of concrete poured on steel deck. The lobby is a double-height space on the ground floor, articulated by large sheets of plate glass held back from the exterior column line, providing for an overhang around the perimeter of the building, behind which the travertine-clad elevator cores are the only elements to touch the ground plane. Above the lobby, the building envelope is curtain wall made of bronze-coloured glass in a matte-black painted steel frame, with exposed I-sections attached to the vertical mullions and structural columns; the modules of this curtain wall are 1.5 m (4 ft 11 in) by 2.7 m (8 ft 10 in), thereby conforming to the overall site template.

The south side of the 54th floor houses Canoe, an Oliver & Bonacini restaurant.

The 55th floor of the TD Bank Tower is now leased office space but was originally a large public indoor observation platform. This promontory allowed uninterrupted views of the development of the downtown core that the TD Centre had itself helped to spark, as well as Lake Ontario to the south. The floor was repurposed to office space when the CN Tower was completed in 1976, offering a viewing height of 447 metres (1,467 ft).

==== Technical details ====
Structure	Image	Date completed	Height	Floors	Address	Architects
TD Bank Tower (formerly Toronto-Dominion Bank Tower)		1967	222.86 m (731.2 ft)	56	66 Wellington Street West	Bregman + Hamann Architects and John B. Parkin Associates in consultation with Ludwig Mies van der Rohe
TD North Tower (formerly Royal Trust Tower)		1969	182.88 m (600.0 ft)	46	77 King Street West	Bregman + Hamann Architects and John B. Parkin Associates in consultation with Ludwig Mies van der Rohe
TD West Tower (formerly Canadian Pacific Tower and Commercial Union Tower)		1974	128.02 m (420.0 ft)	32	100 Wellington Street West	Bregman + Hamann Architects
TD South Tower (formerly TD Waterhouse Tower, Aetna Tower, IBM Tower, and Maritime Life Tower)		1985	153.57 m (503.8 ft)	36	79 Wellington Street West	Bregman + Hamann Architects
222 Bay Street (formerly Clarkson Gordon Tower and then Ernst & Young Tower)		1991	133.20 m (437.0 ft)	31	222 Bay Street	Bregman + Hamann Architects and Scott Tan de Bibiana
95 Wellington Street West		1987	96.93 m (318.0 ft)	22	95 Wellington Street West	Pellow + Associates Architects Inc.

=== Underground concourse ===
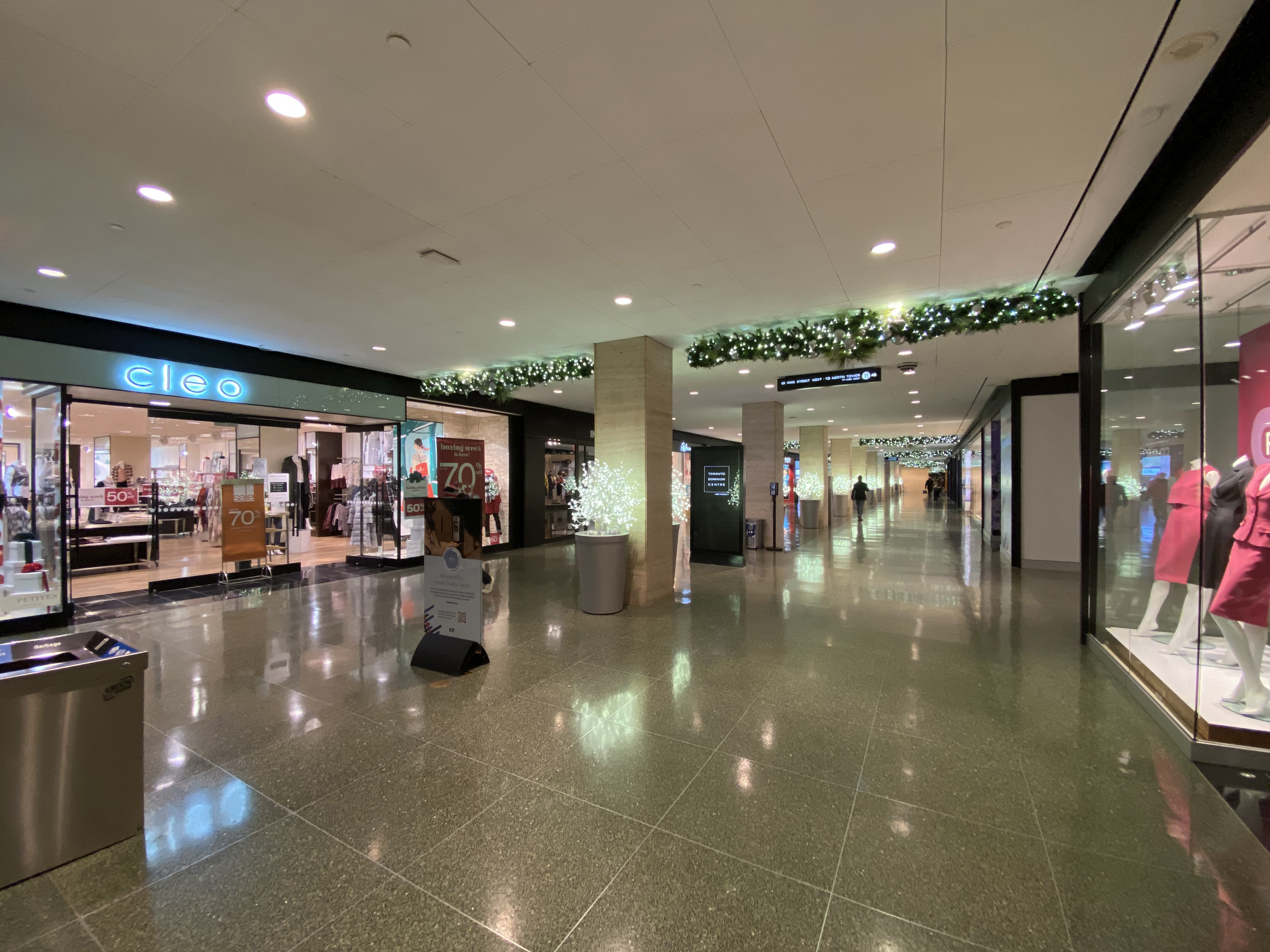
Toronto-Dominion Centre Shopping Concourse in 2021

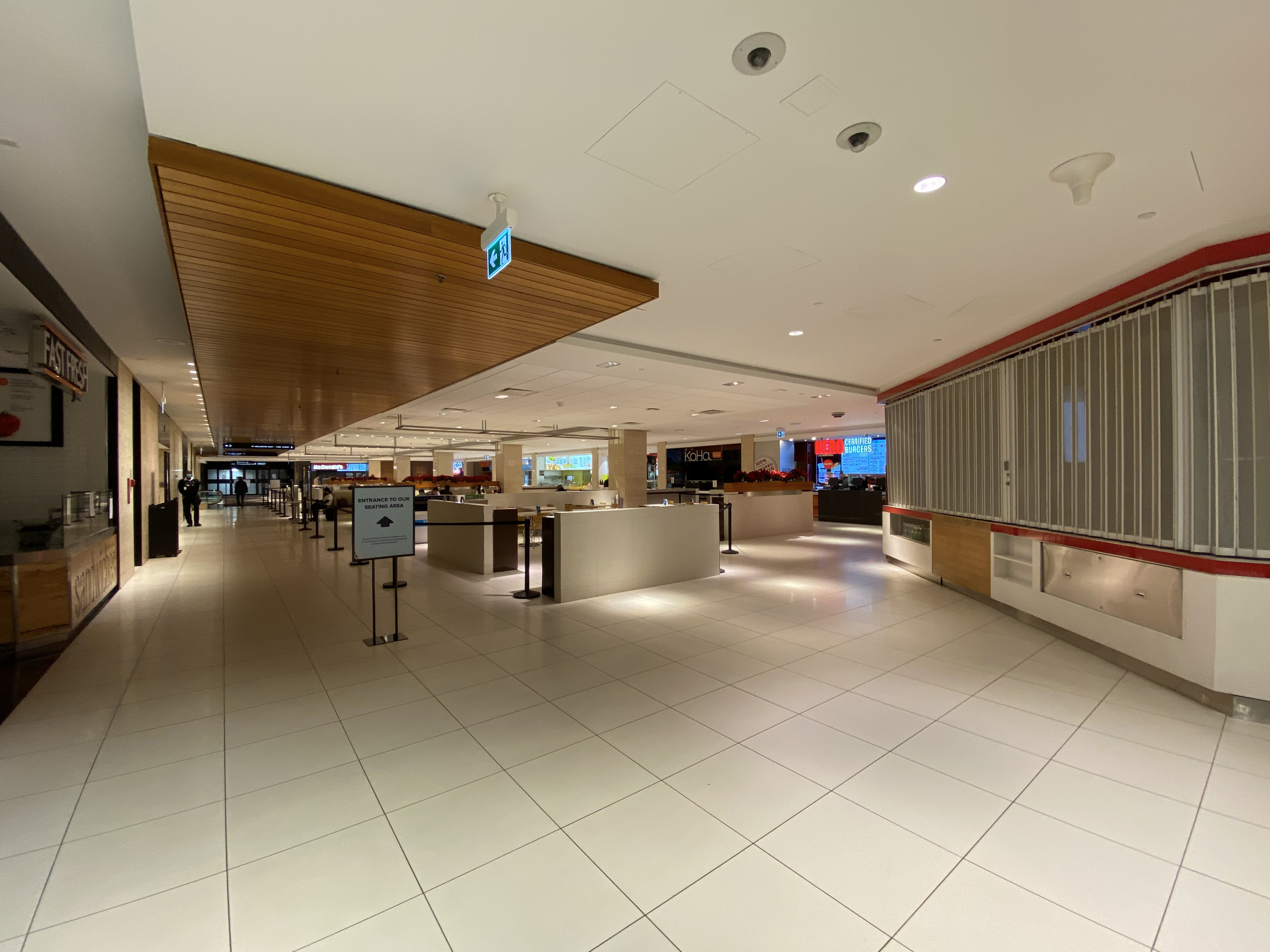
Food court in the complex's underground concourse.

The shopping concourse was seamlessly integrated beneath the towers — the first such mall in Canada — and was the genesis of Toronto's PATH system. Extending into this area was Mies's strict design sense; it was fitted in the same black aluminum and travertine as the main lobbies above. To maintain the clean and ordered aesthetic of the environment, Mies stipulated, with the backing of Phyllis and Alan Lambert, that the storefronts consist only of the glass panels and black aluminium that he specified. Even signage graphics were restricted to only white backlit letters within a black aluminium panel and only in the specific font that Mies had designed for the TD Centre. Renovations to the mall, beginning in the late 1990s, caused some controversy within the architectural community as building management, under pressure from retail tenants seeking greater visibility, relaxed the strict design guidelines and allowed more individual signage. Ceilings were also renovated from the original flat drywall planes with recessed lights to coffered ceilings.

== Occupants ==
The Toronto-Dominion Bank serves as the anchor tenant of the office complex.

=== TD Gallery of Inuit Art ===
The TD Gallery of Inuit Art is a permanent gallery located in the southern half of the TD South Tower lobby. It is open to the public, free, through a partnership between TD Bank, the world's largest collector of Inuit art, and Cadillac Fairview, the property owner in whose lobby space the gallery is hosted.

The bank's association with Inuit art can be traced to the Northwest Territories, where branch manager Allen Lambert oversaw its Yellowknife operation from 1946 to 1947. The branch was a two-room log cabin, with Lambert working in the front and living in the back. Lambert developed a keen interest in the art being produced by local artists. Twenty years later, as Chairman of the Toronto-Dominion Bank, he launched a Centennial project that would establish the bank as a strong ally in providing Inuit art with exposure within the organization and beyond.

=== Design Exchange ===
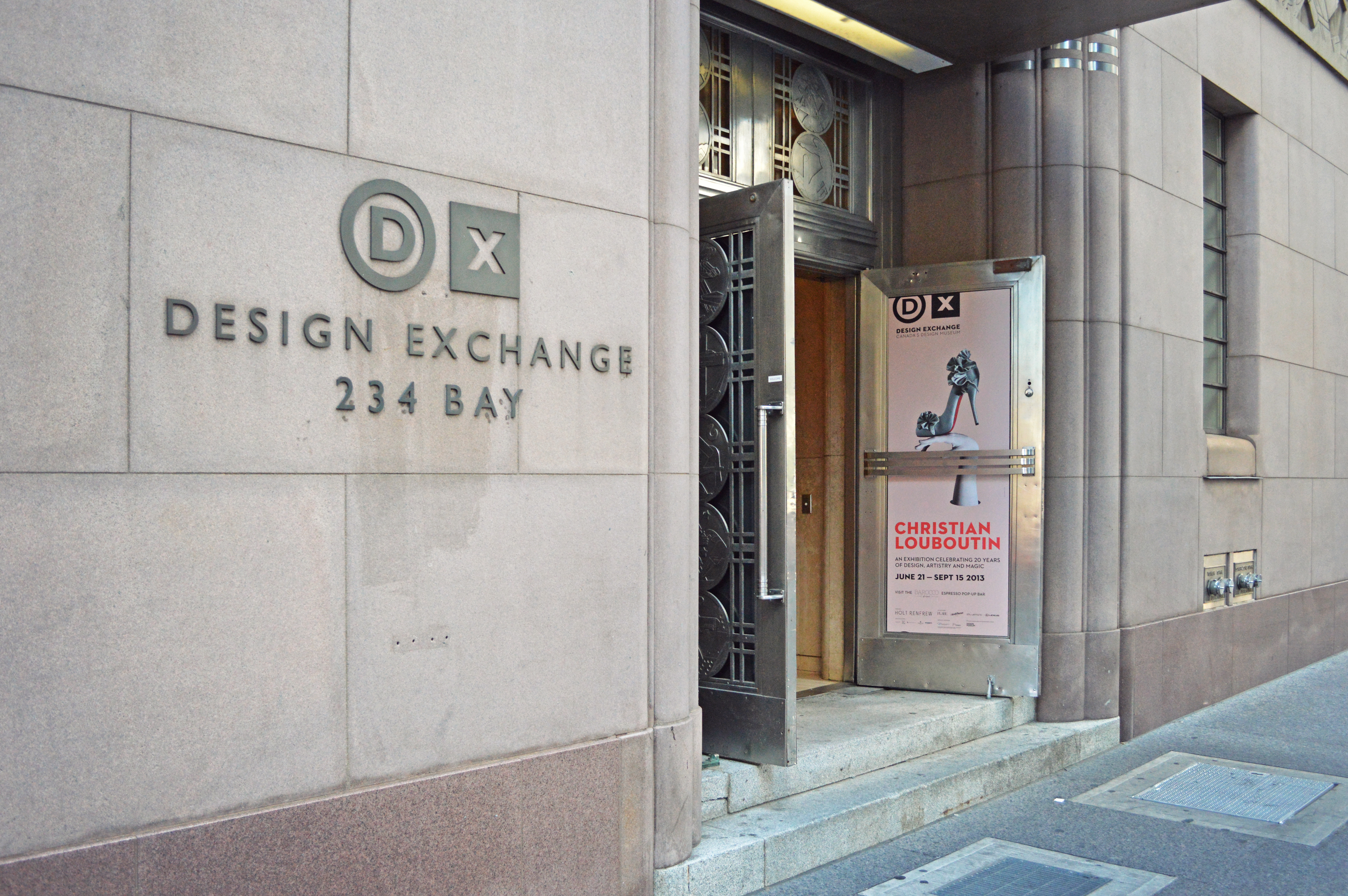
Design Exchange's main entrance

The easternmost tower, 222 Bay Street, contains in its base the historic Toronto Stock Exchange building, built in 1937. Since 1994, it has been home to the Design Exchange (DX), Canada’s only museum dedicated to "design excellence". The genesis of the Design Exchange was a citizen movement seeking a centre that would celebrate the role of design in society. The group worked with the city for several years to bring the concept to fruition and, in 1994, the Design Exchange was officially opened by Prime Minister Jean Chrétien.

Design Exchange has mounted hundreds of exhibitions, seminars, lectures, conferences and educational programs related to the role of design in culture, industry, and business. In 2017, DX launched a 10-day festival called Expo for Design, Innovation & Technology (EDIT), in partnership with the United Nations Development Programme.

== Branding system and signage ==
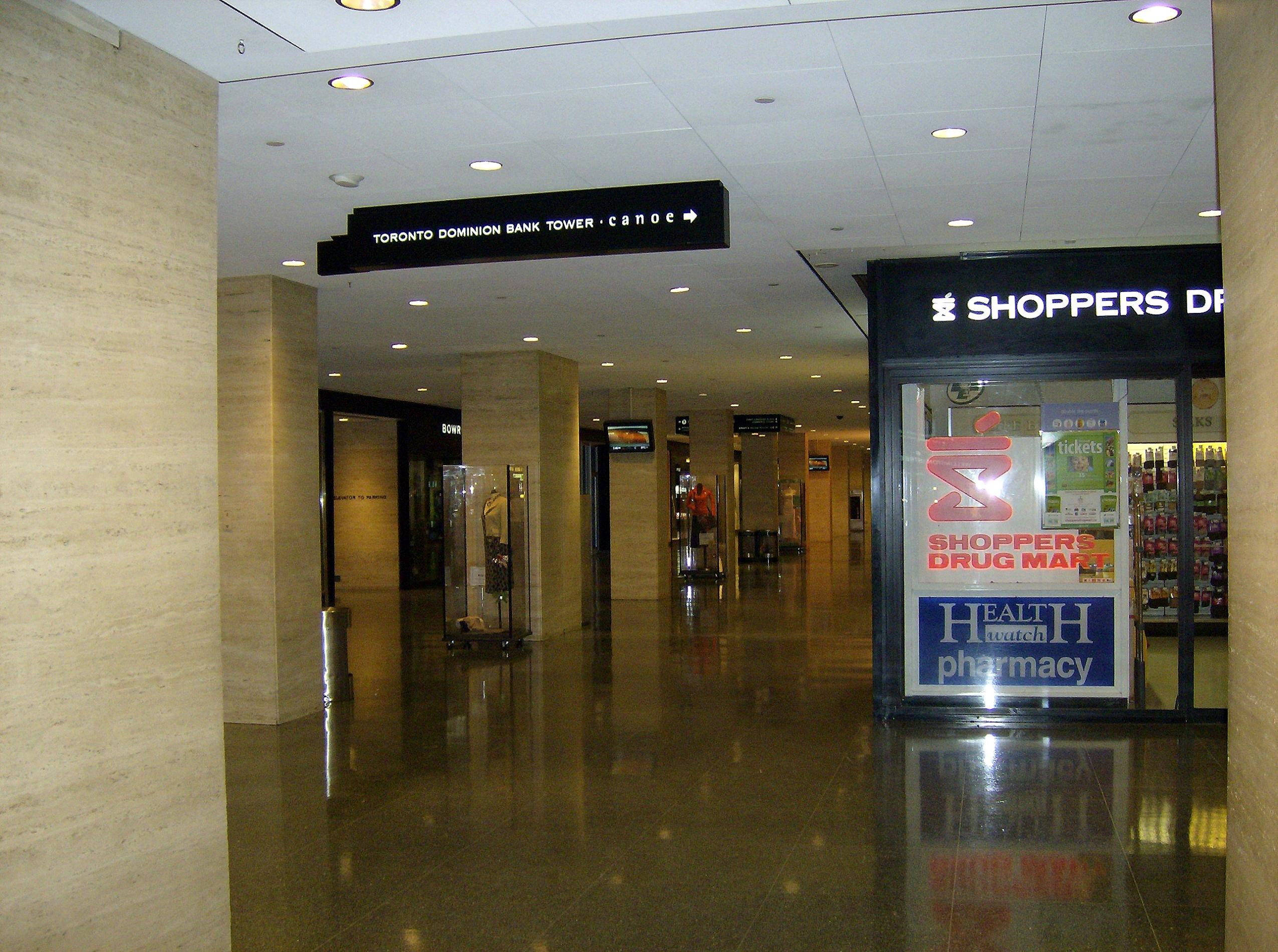
The underground concourse's black aluminum signs mandated by Mies

The TD Centre represents one of commercial real estate's most comprehensive branding systems. Sans Copperplate Gothic was Mies's signature font, as he believed it reflected the calmness and order of the architecture, and he decreed that it be used universally throughout the TD Centre. To this day, the font is used not just on exterior signs and wayfinding, but also for such communications as artwork captions, fire hose cases and designated smoking areas.

Originally, the branding system extended to the stores in the underground shopping mall, such that all of the storefronts displayed their names in an identical font in white against black. However, in the late 1990s, under pressure from retail tenants seeking greater visibility, building management relaxed its requirements and allowed stores to customize their signage to their individual brands. This caused some controversy within the design and architecture community.

There was further controversy in 2015 when TD Bank affixed its green-and-white logo atop two of the towers. Although these signs contravene Mies's strict minimalist vision, the city could not and did not officially oppose the move because the two towers in question were built after Mies's death and are not designated as historic. TD Bank had previously been the sole member of the Big Five banks not to have its logo visible on the Toronto skyline, until a green-and-white "TD" logo was added to spire of the Canada Trust Tower in 2000.

== Programs ==
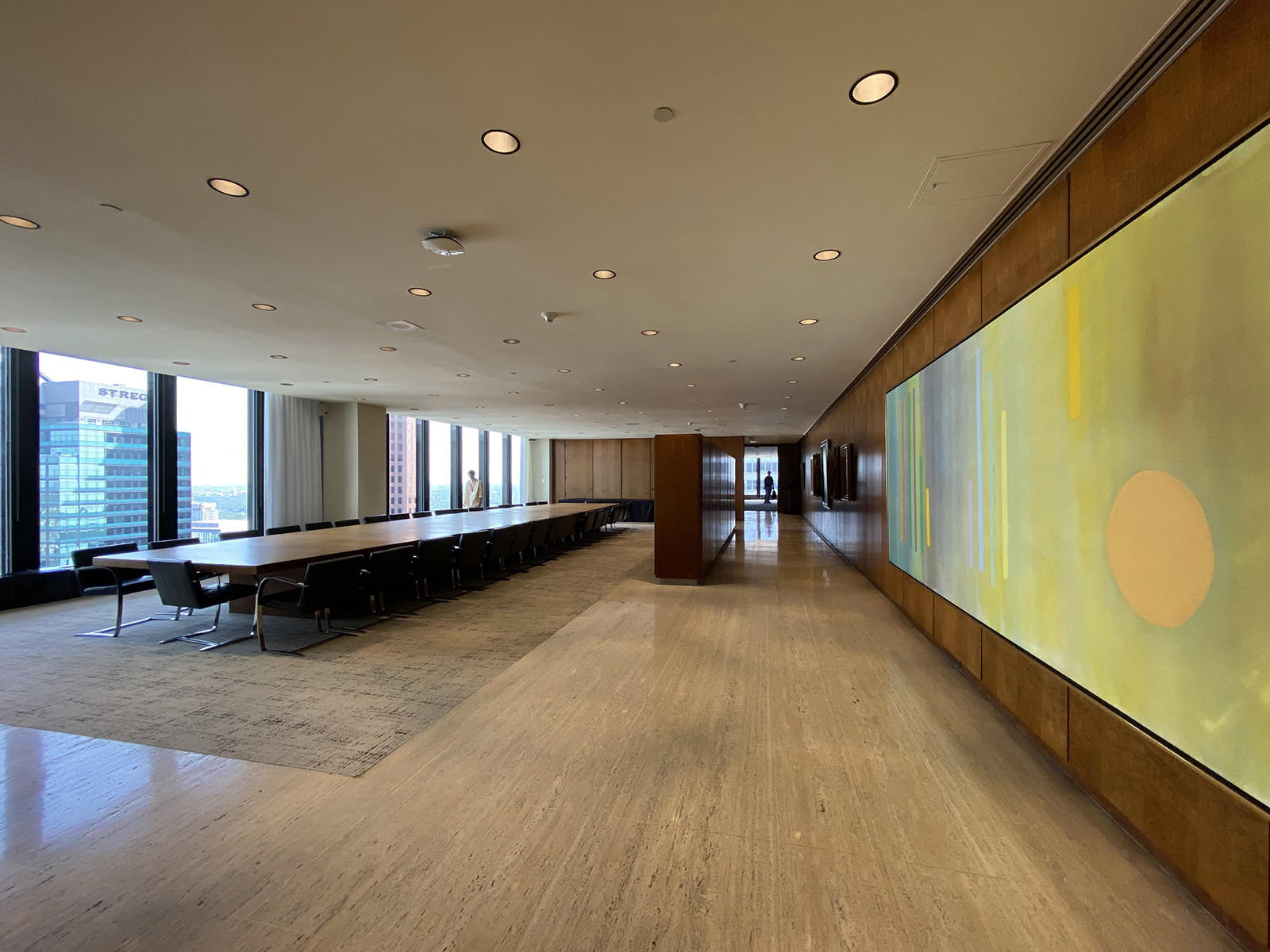
The boardroom on the 54th floor of TD Centre. The room is sometimes exhibited as a part of the annual Doors Open Toronto event

The TD Centre often participates in the annual Doors Open Toronto, providing visitors with behind-the-scenes access to various parts of the property. The 54th-floor executive office space is often showcased but, for 2019, the focus was the recently completed conference centre.

=== Environment ===
The TD Centre has developed one of the most comprehensive environmental programs in the Canadian real estate industry, “promoting sweeping sustainability initiatives across the complex.” In 2004, the TD Centre was one of the founding sponsors of the Enwave Deep Lake Cooling System, which significantly reduces the need for air conditioning during the summer months. In 2009, a living roof consisting of 11,000 grass plants was installed atop the 22,000 ft^{2} banking pavilion through a partnership with TD Bank. The planter boxes maintain the 1.5m^{2} grid pattern of the pavilion's ceiling below, allowing the roof to also give new life to Mies's original vision. The property has a waste diversion rate of 84%, almost double the industry average. It has reduced its annual carbon footprint by over 50%, from over 50,000 tCO2e in 2008 to 19,500 tCO2e in 2018. It has reduced irrigation water usage by 60% through a wireless Nano-Climate system. It was an early adopter of daytime cleaning, which led to reduced energy usage and improved quality of life for the complex's 180 cleaning staff. By 2015, all six towers were certified to LEED EB: O&M Platinum and BOMA BEST (three Gold, three Platinum). In 2017, the 222 Bay Street Tower received WELL gold-level certification, the first existing building in North America to do so. Also in 2017, the TD Centre was the first existing building in Canada to achieve Platinum under the Wired standard. The TD Centre has been publishing an annual sustainability report since 2013.

== In popular culture ==
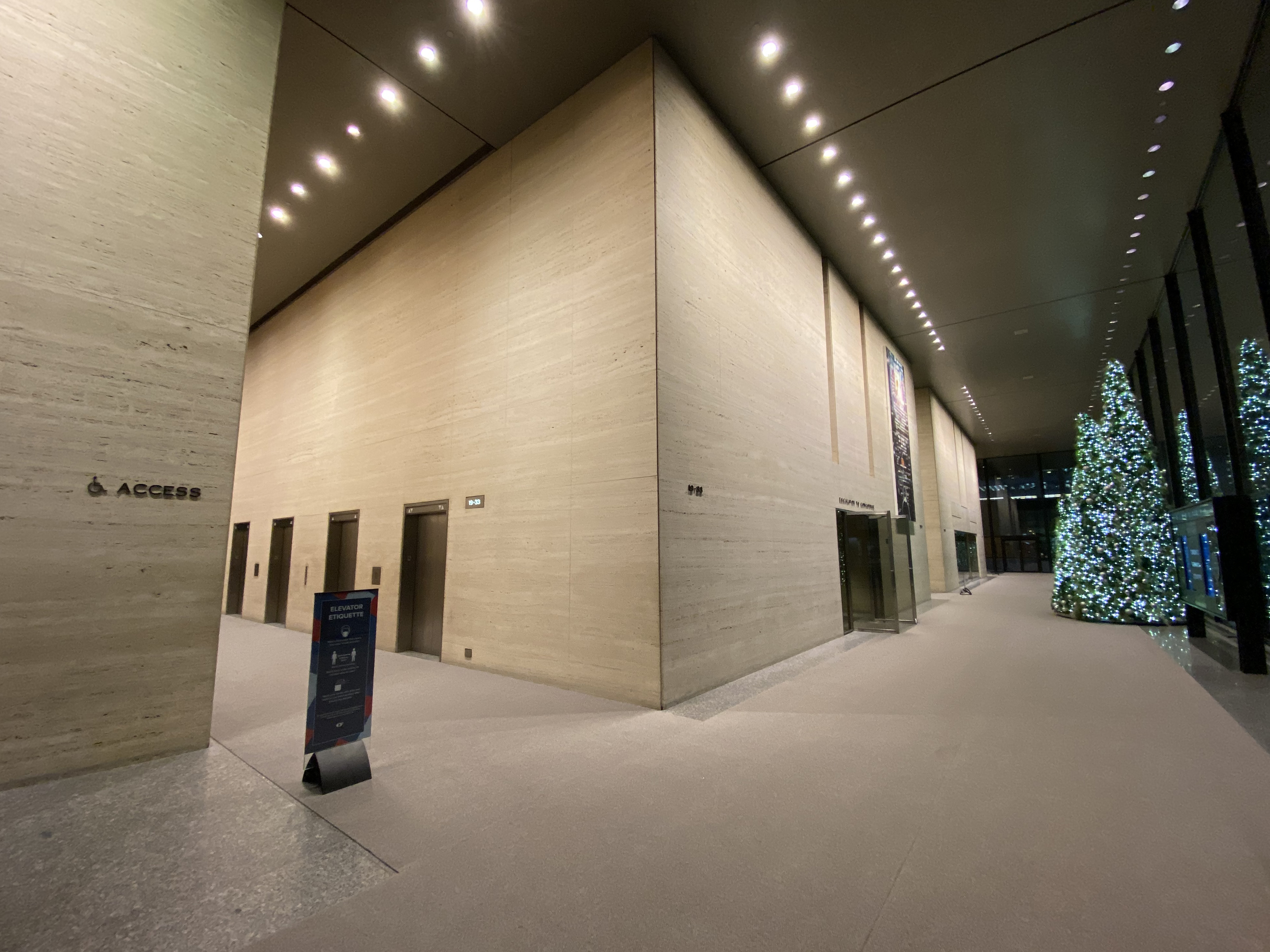
Lobby in the TD North Tower

The TD Bank Tower is used for exterior shots of Jabot Cosmetics' headquarters on the CBS daytime soap opera, The Young and the Restless.

The TD Bank Tower and TD North Tower are used for exterior and lobby shots of the Pierce & Pierce offices in the 2000 film American Psycho.

== See also ==
- Architecture of Toronto
- List of tallest buildings in Canada
- List of tallest buildings in Toronto
