= Astley v Verdun =

- Court: Ontario Superior Court of Justice
- Full case name: Robert M. Astley v. J. Robert Verdun
- Decided: May 20, 2011 (jury decision); June 6, 2011 (injunction)
- Citation: 2011 ONSC 3651

Court membership
- Judge sitting: Chapnick J.

Case opinions
- In rare cases, if a person has defamed another person, the court may order an injunction against the defaming party from publishing anything in relation to the defamed party if the defaming party 1) intends to continue defaming the other party after the trial is over, and 2) there is no likelihood that the defaming party will compensate or pay damages to the defamed party.

Astley v Verdun, 2011 ONSC 3651, is a leading defamation decision released by Ontario Superior Court of Justice. The case was publicized for the amount of damages awarded to the plaintiff, and the permanent injunction ordered against the defendant.

== Background ==
Robert Astley was the CEO and President of Clarica Life Assurance (formerly Mutual Life of Canada) from 1993 to 2002. In 2002, Astley became the President of Sun Life Financial and oversaw the merger of Clarica and Sun Life. In 2004, Astley retired and became a director of the Bank of Montreal and the Canadian Pension Plan Investment Board (CPPIB). In 2008, Astley was appointed as Chairperson of the CPPIB.

J Robert Verdun was former newspaper publisher who was known for his controversial editorials. He frequently appeared at general shareholder meetings for public corporations to demand higher accountability to shareholders.

In December 2004, Verdun wrote an email to the Bank of Montreal chairperson to complain about Astley's appointment to the board. Verdun described Astley as "unethical, greedy, and narrowly-focused". At a later Bank of Montreal shareholder meeting, Verdun publicly called Astley a "stain on this board" and that Astley had no integrity or ethics.

In November 2005, Verdun filed a shareholders proposal with several banks that further defamed Astley.

Astley's lawyers wrote to Verdun to warn him to stop defaming Astley. Instead, Verdun wrote to the Ontario Securities Commission to complain that Astley lacked the integrity to serve as director, and released the letter to the media.

Over the years, Verdun publicly called Astley "unethical", "corrupt", "dishonest", "a petty operator", "lacking in integrity", and "motivated by greed".

Verdun later wrote a book, The Fox in Charge of the Biggest Henhouse in Canada, which further defamed Astley. As a result, the book is not available in Canada.

The trial judge would later describe Verdun's actions as being motivated by malice.

In May 2006, Astley filed a statement of claim against Verdun, suing him for defamation. According to The Globe and Mail such defamation lawsuits are rare "because companies and their top brass don't want to look as if they're muzzling small shareholders." shareholders

== Hearing ==
=== Counterclaim ===
Following Astley's filing of the statement of claim, various major newspapers reported on the case. Verdun claimed that Astley had provided the newspapers with a copy of the statement of claim in order to defame Verdun, and filed a counterclaim, suing Astley for defamation.

On April 15, 2008, the counterclaim was summarily dismissed for lack of compliance with the Libel and Slander Act, which restricts lawsuits based on libel in a newspaper unless the plaintiff makes a complaint in writing within six weeks of plaintiff becoming aware of the alleged libel. Although notice is not an absolute requirement, the court found that there were no justified reasons for non-compliance.

On October 21, 2008, the Court of Appeal for Ontario dismissed Verdun's appeal. On March 5, 2009, the Supreme Court of Canada refused leave to appeal.

=== Witnesses for the Plaintiff ===
- Robert Prichard, President and CEO of Torstar Corporation and Dean and President of the University of Toronto
- David Ganong, Chairperson of the Board of Mutual Life in 1999 and later, Clarica Life Assurance for three years who worked closely with Mr. Astley
- David Galloway, CEO of Torstar until 2002 and now Chair of the Board at Bank of Montreal.

=== Defendant self represented ===
Robert Verdun was self represented, and did not call any witnesses.

== Jury decision and damages ==
On May 20, 2011, a jury found that all eight statements by Verdun that Astley complained of were defamatory, and that Verdun had acted with malice. These statements included the emails to the Bank of Montreal board, the letter to the Ontario Securities Commission, the public statements made at the shareholder meetings, and the statements made in the shareholder proposals. The jury rejected the defences of qualified privilege and responsible communication.

The jury awarded damages against Verdun in the amount of $650,000, including $400,000 in aggravated damages. This is considered to be one of the largest amounts of aggravated damages for a defamation case in Canadian history.

== Injunction ==
On June 6, 2011, the court ordered a permanent injunction against Verdun. The order was:

I order a permanent injunction to issue against the defendant, J. Robert Verdun, restraining him from disseminating, posting on the Internet or publishing, in any manner whatsoever, directly or indirectly, any statements or comments about the plaintiff, Robert M. Astley. This injunction shall include the publication, circulation and promotion of the book entitled "The Fox In Charge…" and any similar or other publications. For further particularity, the defendant shall not publish or cause to be published or otherwise disseminate or distribute in any manner whatsoever, whether by way of the Internet or other medium, any statements or other communications which refer to Robert Astley by name, depiction or description.

— Justice Sandra Chapnik, Ontario Superior Court of Justice

In doing so, the judge found:

- Verdun intended to continue defaming Astley, even after the jury's decision, including publishing his book.
- There was a very real possibility that Verdun would not pay the damages to Astley (and in fact, two prior costs orders against Verdun were still outstanding).

The judge agreed that restraining Verdun's freedom of speech should only be done in the clearest and rarest of cases. However, the judge went on to find that this was one of those cases. Verdun was later found guilty of contempt of the 2011 order, deliberately breaching the order without justification, excuse, or defence to the allegation of contempt of court.

== See also ==
- Grant v Torstar Corp
