= E. Sydney Jackson =

Canadian actuary (1922–2016)

- Born: 17 May 1922; Regina, Saskatchewan
- Died: 10 April 2016 (aged 93); Toronto, Ontario
- Education: University of Manitoba (BCom 1947)
- Spouse: Nancy Joyce Stovel (m. 1948)
- Military career
- Allegiance: Canada
- Branch: Canadian Army
- Service years: 1943–1945
- Rank: Lieutenant
- Conflicts: World War II

Edwin Sydney Jackson (17 May 1922 – 10 April 2016) was a Canadian actuary who served as president and chairman of Manulife. Jackson joined the Manufacturers' Life Insurance Company in 1948 in Toronto, and during the 1950s and 1960s rose through the company's ranks. In 1970 he was elected a director, and in 1972 was appointed president. After the death of Manulife's chairman in 1978, he became acting chairman of the board. In 1985, Jackson stepped down from the presidency and was elected chairman. He served in that role until 1990, through he stayed on as a director. After the abrupt resignation of chairman Thomas di Giacomo in August 1993, Jackson served as the interim chairman until March 1994. That year, aged 72, Jackson retired from Manulife.

== Biography ==
Edwin Sydney Jackson was born on 17 May 1922 in Regina to Edwin Jackson (1882–19??) and Dorothy Hazel Bell (1892–1974). In 1940 he graduated from Regina Central Collegiate. From 1943 to 1945, Jackson served as an officer in the Canadian Army.

After the war, Jackson enrolled at the University of Manitoba, and in 1947 graduated Bachelor of Commerce. Following graduation, he taught actuarial studies for a year. In 1948, he moved to Toronto where he joined the actuarial department of the Manufacturers' Life Insurance Company. In 1952 he became an assistant actuary, in 1956 an actuary, and in 1964 an actuarial vice-president. In 1969 he was appointed a senior vice-president, and in 1970 became an executive vice-president and was elected to the board of directors. For the 1966–67 year, he served as president of the Canadian Institute of Actuaries.

On 1 January 1972, Jackson succeeded Alfred Thomas Seedhouse as president of the company. At this time, Seedhouse was elected chairman of the board. When Seedhouse died on 12 February 1978, Jackson became the acting chairman.

In August 1985, Jackson stepped down from the presidency and was elected chairman of the board and chief executive officer. The presidency was assumed by Thomas Anthony di Giacomo, who gained the chief operating officer title also. In January 1987, Jackson ceded the chief executive role to Giacomo. Effective 1 May 1990, Jackson stepped down from the chair, and Giacomo was elected chairman in addition to president and chief executive. On 19 August 1993, Giacomo resigned from the company, leaving the offices of president, chairman, and chief executive vacant. Giacomo's resignation came after a falling out with the board that had begun in November 1991. Upon Giacomo's departure, William R. C. Blundell was appointed interim president, while Jackson became interim chairman. In early 1994, Manulife recruited Dominic D'Alessandro, then president of the Laurentian Bank of Canada, as its next president, while Blundell was elected chairman of the board. After Blundell's election, Jackson announced his retirement from the company.

On 19 May 1948, Jackson married Nancy Joyce Stovel (1927–1998) of Winnipeg. The Jacksons had three daughters: Patricia, Barbara, and Catherine. Sydney Jackson was a member of the Granite Club, Toronto Club, and United Church of Canada. He died at his home in Toronto on 10 April 2016, a month short of his 94th birthday.
