= Credit management =

Concept in finance

Credit management is the process of granting credit, setting the terms on which it is granted, recovering this credit when it is due, and ensuring compliance with company credit policy, among other credit related functions. This task is often performed by a credit manager who is a person employed by an organization to manage the credit department and make decisions concerning credit limits, acceptable levels of risk, terms of payment and enforcement actions with their customers. Key stages of credit management include credit assessment (with credit rating evaluation), decision-making, limit setting, portfolio monitoring, collection activities, and performance reporting.

The goal within a bank or company, in controlling credit, is to improve revenues and profit by facilitating sales and reducing financial risks. A structured credit policy ensures that the credit team uses a standardized method for managing a customer’s credit risk. This leads to consistent credit decisions and eliminating compliance issues because there is an audit trail.

== Tasks ==
Credit management and the credit manager function is often combined with accounts receivable and collections department of a company.

The role of a credit manager is variable in its scope, with typical responsibilities such as:

- Controlling bad debt exposure and expenses, through the direct management of credit terms on the company's ledgers
- Maintaining strong cash flows through efficient collections. The efficiency of cash flow is measured using various methods, a common one of which is days sales outstanding (DSO).
- Ensuring an adequate allowance for doubtful accounts is kept by the company
- Monitoring the accounts receivable portfolio for trends and warning signs
- Hiring and firing credit analysts, accounts receivable and collections personnel
- Enforcing the "stop list" of supply of goods and services to customers
- Removing bad debts from the ledger (bad debt write-offs)
- Setting credit limits
- Setting credit terms beyond those within credit analysts' authority
- Setting credit rating criteria
- Setting and ensuring compliance with a corporate credit policy
- Pursuing legal remedies for non-payers
- Obtaining security interests where necessary, such as PPSAs, letters of credit, or personal guarantees
- Initiating legal or other recovery actions against customers who are delinquent

== Types of credit managers ==
Credit managers tend to fall into one of three groups depending on the specific legal and jurisdictional knowledge required:

1. Commercial credit manager
2. Consumer credit managers
3. Construction credit managers

== Construction credit management ==
Construction credit management is considered a specialist area of credit management for the construction industry that require specific skill due to the nature of construction projects. These include:

1. Strong knowledge of security and lien law within the province, state or territory,
2. The ability to understand how money moves through the construction pyramid
3. People skills that go beyond traditional credit management in that the credit manager may be required to deal with managerial and non-managerial staff of both the white and blue collar variety,
4. A basic knowledge of construction and the willingness to make site visits if needed.

== Professional organizations by country ==
=== Australia ===
Credit managers in Australia obtain memberships from the Australian Institute of Credit Management (AICM). Qualifications and continuing education can also be obtained from here.

=== Canada ===
Credit professionals in Canada can obtain the official designation, Certified Credit Professional – CCP (formerly known as the Fellow Credit Institute — FCI), from the Credit Institute of Canada.

=== France ===
Credit professionals in France can obtain memberships, continuing education and certification through the French Association of Credit Managers, called Association Française des Credit Managers AFDCC.

=== United Kingdom ===
Credit managers operating within the United Kingdom can obtain accreditation from the Chartered Institute of Credit Management, called the Chartered Institute of Credit Management from 1 January 2015 after it was granted a Royal Charter.

=== United States ===
Credit managers in the United States can obtain memberships, continuing education and certification through the National Association of Credit Management. Certification levels include Credit Business Associate, Certified Credit and Risk Analyst, Credit Business Fellow, Certified Credit Executive, Certified International Credit Professional and International Certified Credit Executive.

== See also ==
- Accountant
- Bookkeeper
- Billing
- Credit assistant
- Credit analyst
- Director of credit and collections
