= Credit Institute of Canada =

- Abbreviation: CIC
- Formation: June 11, 1928
- Type: Not-for-profit
- Purpose: Credit Management Education
- Headquarters: Toronto, Ontario, Canada
- Region served: Canada
- Members: 10000+
- Official language: English & French
- General Manager: Nawshad Khadaroo, CCP
- Website: www.creditinstitute.org

The Credit Institute of Canada (CIC) (French: Institut de crédit du Canada) is a not-for-profit organization created by a special Act of Parliament on June 11, 1928. The CIC provides credit management resources, education and certification to its members and is the only organization that grants official designations to professionals in the Canadian credit management field.

== History ==
The post-war era of the 1920s saw a dynamic growth of business across Canada where an increased need for credit management arose. Members of the C.C.M.T.A. (Canadian Credit Men's Trust Association Ltd.) realized that in order to build on the credit profession, it was necessary to establish an institution dedicated to the needs of the credit managers. By December 1927, an application was made to Canada to formally incorporate and recognize the Institute as a non-profit professional association. On June 11, 1928, a Special Act of Parliament (Chapter 76 of the Statutes of Canada, 18–19 George V, Part 2) was passed, and the Canadian Credit Institute was born. The first three chapters of the Institute – Toronto Chapter, Montreal Chapter and British Columbia Chapter – were established in 1929. As the need for sound credit management increased, additional chapters of the CIC were added across the country.

Since 1928 the Institute has undergone numerous changes. Originally belonging to the C.C.M.T.A. (now known as Creditel of Canada Ltd.) the Institute has since become completely independent. The name of the Institute has changed twice from the Canadian Credit Institute to the Canadian Institute of Credit and Financial Management and finally to the Credit Institute of Canada.

== Organization ==
=== Membership and Designations ===
CIC members adhere to a code of ethics and professional conduct to ensure the good character and reputation of the credit and financial Professional. In order to stay active, members must participate in and report to CIC's professional development program. The following designations are offered to qualified members:

- Certified Credit Professional, CCP – the CCP designation is granted to members who have passed a comprehensive certification program. This includes acquiring the required education and at least five years of work experience in a credit position.
- Certified Credit Professional, CCP (Emeritus) – Since 1929 the CIC has bestowed on worthy members a special designation that is the highest honour the Institute can award. This initially started out to be the Fellow, Credit Institute (FCI) designation. In 1992 this was changed to FCI (Emeritus) and later to CCP (Emeritus). The CCP (Emeritus) designations are conferred on deserving individuals for distinguished and meritorious service in the advancement of credit education and the credit profession in Canada.
- Credit Specialist Certificate – The Credit Specialist Certificate is granted to those who have successfully completed the first four courses of the CCP Program and have acquired at least three years of practical experience.
- Associate Credit Institute, ACI

Affiliate Membership is also granted to persons interested in credit-related seminars, conferences, networking opportunities and/or the balance of membership benefits available to Credit Institute of Canada members.

=== Education ===
The Credit Institute of Canada offers a variety of programs in credit and financial education through the Program of Professional Studies.

- Certified Credit Professional (CCP) Program aims to provide the management skills in a role of credit management. Two of the eight courses are in-depth credit management courses while each of the remaining six core courses focuses on accounting, economics, communications, law, finance and management information system respectively. Combining five years of work experience in a credit position, this program ultimately leads to the CCP designation.
- Commercial Credit Administration Program is designed for entry-level to intermediate credit personnels. It provides the opportunity to learn the basics of credit and a foundation for the CCP Program.
- National Collector Certificate program Is designed to enhance students' knowledge in the area of credit & debt recovery.
- Short Modules are a series of short online courses on a variety of credit- and finance-related topics offered to interested persons.

Scholarships are offered through The Canadian Credit Institute Education Foundation (CCIEF), a federally registered Canadian charity established in 1967. The CCIEF's mandate is furthering credit education and making sure it is accessible to individuals across Canada with program content that is current, professional and valuable. The scholarship committee consists of four active members of the Credit Institute of Canada, each holding a Credit Institute designation.

The CIC has established partnerships with CGA-Canada and the Canadian Construction Association. The following post-secondary institutions recognize CIC's professional education and designations by listing CIC's courses in their own course calendars: University of Toronto, McMaster University, Simon Fraser University, Southern Alberta Institute of Technology, Northern Alberta Institute of Technology, and Fanshaw College.

=== Chapters ===
Chapter	Year Established
Toronto	1929
British Columbia	1929
Montreal	1929
Saskatchewan	1931
Edmonton	1931
Calgary	1935
Manitoba	1937
Hamilton & District	1963
Conestoga	1966
Quebec City	1967
Ottawa	1971
South Western Ontario	1976
Atlantic	1986

=== National Conference ===
A National Conference is held by the Credit Institute of Canada every two years in an effort to encourage communications and the exchange of information within the credit industry. The last conference was held in June, 2022 in Banff, Alberta.
