= Robert Verdun =

Robert Verdun may refer to:

- J Robert Verdun, Canadian activist shareholder-rights advocate
- Robert Verdun (figure skater), Belgian figure skater
