= Pankaj Tibrewal =

Entrepreneur & fund manager

- Born: Kolkata, West Bengal, India
- Education: St. Xavier's College, Kolkata; Manchester University
- Occupation: Entrepreneur
- Known for: Fund manager of Kotak Mutual Fund
- Website: Bachelor of Commerce; Master of Finance

Pankaj Tibrewal is an Indian entrepreneur and fund manager. He is the founder and CIO of IKIGAI Asset Manager. Before founding IKIGAI, Pankaj was the senior executive vice president and fund manager at Kotak Mahindra AMC. He has been featured in the Best Fund Manager rankings of ET Wealth-Morningstar consecutively six times from 2016 to 2022.

== Education and career ==
Pankaj graduated from St. Xavier's College, Kolkata, and pursued a master's degree in finance from the University of Manchester. He began his career as a credit analyst and then moved into managing equity funds. He managed various debt and equity schemes, including Kotak Small Cap Fund, Kotak Emerging Equity Fund, Kotak ELSS Tax Saver Fund, Kotak Business Cycle Fund, Kotak Multi Asset Allocation Fund, Kotak Equity Opportunities Fund, and Kotak Debt Hybrid Fund. In 2010, he was part of the fund management team at Principal PNB Asset Management Company. At Kotak, he managed four funds with assets under management totaling around Rs 56,000 crore. These funds included the Kotak Small Cap Fund, Kotak Emerging Equity Fund, Kotak Equity Hybrid Fund, and Kotak Business Cycle Fund. In 2010, Pankaj took over the management of Kotak Emerging Equity and Kotak Small Cap Fund. Over time, Kotak Emerging Equity grew to become the second-largest midcap fund in India, while Kotak Small Cap Fund became the country's fifth-largest small-cap fund.

In 2017, Pankaj was listed among the top 10 mutual fund managers by the Economic Times. He consistently ranked in the Best Fund Manager listings of ET Wealth-Morningstar from 2016 to 2022. In 2019, he received the Best Engagement by an Institutional Investor award at the IR Magazine Awards India. Pankaj was also featured in Outlook Business magazine in 2016, 2017, 2021, and Fortune India in 2024.
