= Paraglide (company) =

Financial technology company

- Type: Private
- Industry: Financial technology, artificial intelligence
- Founded: July 31, 2025; 15 months ago
- Founders: Rasmus Areskoug; Andreas Åström
- Headquarters: London, United Kingdom
- Key people: Rasmus Areskoug; Andreas Åström
- Products: Accounts receivable automation software
- Website: www.paraglide.ai

Paraglide is a British-Swedish financial technology company. It builds artificial intelligence agents that automate accounts receivable, answering customers' billing questions and following up on unpaid invoices. The company is headquartered in London, United Kingdom, with its technology team based in Malmö, Sweden.

== History ==
Paraglide was founded in 2025 by Rasmus Areskoug and Andreas Åström, who had previously worked as chief financial officer and head of engineering, respectively, at the Swedish sales-enablement company GetAccept. Its UK legal entity, Paraglide AI Limited, was incorporated on 31 July 2025 as Snowpath AI Limited and renamed Paraglide AI Limited on 29 September 2025.

In the summer of 2025, Paraglide raised an initial funding round of about 45 million Swedish kronor co-led by Bessemer Venture Partners and DN Capital. According to Dagens industri, the round valued the company at close to 180 million kronor.

Early customers included GetAccept, the Norwegian company Ardoq, and the German company Choco; Areskoug said a handful of customers were paying six-figure (Swedish krona) annual fees on a usage-based subscription model.

In February 2026, Paraglide was named in a list of ten Swedish startups compiled by EU-Startups.

== Operations ==
According to the company, Paraglide's billing agent responds to customer enquiries within existing email threads, while its collections agent sends payment reminders and follows up on overdue invoices, replacing what Areskoug described as a largely ignored, template-based reminder process, and referring cases requiring human judgement to the accounts receivable team along with the conversation history.

Reviewing the market for AI-native accounts receivable software in 2026, the technology-selection firm Viewpoint Analysis described Paraglide as offering "European finance teams an AI-native option outside the largely US-centric field of newer entrants."

In a case study published in February 2026, the IT consultancy Noresca described integrating Paraglide's software with Oracle NetSuite for GetAccept, an early Paraglide customer and the founders' former employer. In July 2026, the accounting platform AccountsIQ announced a partnership to integrate Paraglide's billing and collections agents into its software. In August 2026, the Chartered Institute of Credit Management (CICM) named Paraglide a corporate partner.
