= Guloien =

Surname list

Guloien is a surname. Notable people with the surname include:

- Donald Guloien, Canadian business executive
- Krista Guloien (born 1980), Canadian rower
- P. J. Perry (Paul John Guloien, born 1941), Canadian saxophonist
