= Joseph Pigott =

Canadian businessman (1885–1969)

- Born: 23 February 1885; Hamilton, Ontario,
- Died: 20 April 1969 (aged 84); Hamilton, Ontario
- Occupation: Businessman
- Spouse: Yvonne Prince (m. 1913)
- Children: 6

Joseph Michael Pigott Sr. (23 February 1885 – 20 April 1969) was a Canadian businessman, who jointly ran Pigott Construction Company, responsible for some of Canada's largest industrial plants and finest buildings.

== Early life ==
He was born in Hamilton, Ontario on February 23, 1885, the son of a prominent Irish contractor (Michael Pigott, himself the founder of Pigott Construction Co. and the son of an Irish farmer who emigrated to Canada and settled near Guelph).

In 1903 he began working for his father's construction company. In 1909 Pigott travelled to Saskatchewan with his younger brother Roy where they secured a large contract to build St. Paul's Hospital in Saskatoon.

While in the West, Pigott met and married Yvonne Prince, daughter of the Honorable Joseph Benjamin Prince of Battlefield, Saskatchewan. They had 6 sons: William, Jean-Jacques, Joseph, Patrick, Ronald and Paul.

== Career ==
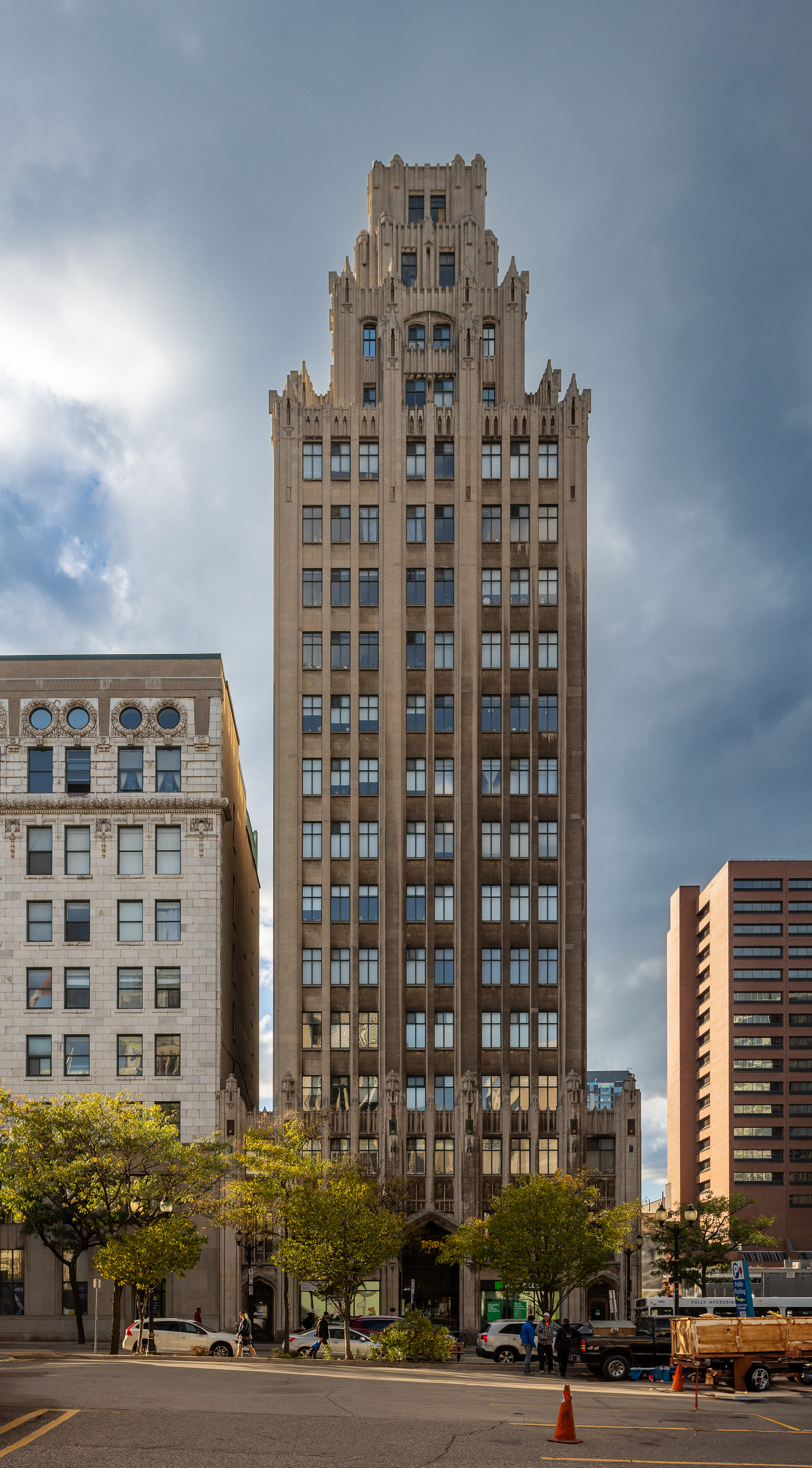
The Pigott Building in Hamilton

Together the brothers would direct Pigott Construction to fortune and fame. Roy looked after the engineering and Joseph took care of the business administration. The first $1,000,000 year came in 1926, and in 1930, Hamilton's earliest skyscraper, the 18-storey Pigott Building, was completed.

After the Second World War, Pigott Construction was Canada's largest privately owned construction company, amassing more than $113,000,000 in business in a single year.

Pigott built some of Canada's largest industrial plants and finest buildings: the Royal Ontario Museum, Toronto; Toronto Dominion Centre, Toronto; Crown Life Insurance Company head office, Toronto; Bank of Canada, Ottawa; a plant for General Motors, Oshawa, and buildings for A. V. Roe Company in Malton. In Hamilton, buildings built by his firm included: the Canadian Westinghouse offices, Banks of Nova Scotia, Royal and Montreal, McMaster University, the County Court House, Westdale Secondary School, St. Joseph's Hospital, the Pigott Building, the new City Hall and the Cathedral of Christ the King.

== Honours ==
Pigott was honoured for many of his accomplishments:

Knight Commander of the Order of St. Gregory the Great and later "Con Placa" - in recognition of the Cathedral, by Pope Pius XI.

Commander of The Most Excellent Order of the British Empire (in 1946), in recognition of his services to the Government of Canada during the war, particularly as president of the Wartime Housing Ltd.

Knight of magistral grace of the Sovereign Military Order of Malta (in 1953) and awarded the honorary degree of LL.D by McMaster University (1962) in consideration of his contributions to social welfare and to the political and intellectual life of Christian society.

== Other roles ==
He was a former president of the Canadian Construction Association, Hamilton Chamber of Commerce, a former vice-president and director of the Toronto-Dominion Bank, president of Pigott Realty Ltd., vice-president and director of The North American Life Assurance Company, director of Canada Permanent Trust Company, Atlas Steels Ltd., and United Fuel Investments Ltd.

Pigott was also a former president of the board of governors of the Art Gallery of Hamilton, a director of the Ontario Heart Foundation, chairman of the advisory committee of St. Joseph's Hospital, a member of the Hamilton Club, the Hamilton Golf and Country Club and the National Club of Toronto. Pigott played an enormous role in the development of Hamilton.

== Death ==
He died in Hamilton on 20 April 1969.

== See also ==
- List of tallest buildings in Hamilton, Ontario
