= Director of credit and collections =

A director of credit and collections is a senior-level employee in an organization's credit department. Job responsibilities may include:

- Overseeing credit and collection functions
- Hiring, firing, evaluating and promoting credit department employees
- Administrating credit policies
- Evaluating and improving collection effectiveness
- Encouraging sales growth
- Mentoring credit managers, credit analysts and other credit department personnel

== Education and background ==
Employees holding the director of credit and collections position typically have a bachelor's degree or higher, 15–20 years of credit experience, global experience and a Certified Credit Executive designation from the National Association of Credit Management (NACM).

== Employment ==
As of June 2016, the median salary for a director of credit and collections is $105,282. They typical salary is between $90,419 and $125,160.

== Professional organizations ==
Credit analysts in the United States can obtain memberships, continuing education and certification through NACM. Certification levels include Credit Business Associate, Certified Credit and Risk Analyst, Credit Business Fellow, Certified Credit Executive, Certified International Credit Professional and International Certified Credit Executive.

== See also ==
- Credit assistant
- Credit analyst
- Credit manager
