= Credit analysis =

Method used for calculating creditworthiness

Credit analysis is the method by which one calculates the creditworthiness of a business or organization. In other words, It is the evaluation of the ability of a company to honor its financial obligations. The audited financial statements of a large company might be analyzed when it issues or has issued bonds. Or, a bank may analyze the financial statements of a small business before making or renewing a commercial loan. The term refers to either case, whether the business is large or small. A credit analyst is the finance professional undertaking this role.

== Role ==
One objective of credit analysis is to look at both the borrower and the lending facility being proposed and to assign a risk rating. The risk rating is derived by estimating the probability of default by the borrower at a given confidence level over the life of the facility, and by estimating the amount of loss that the lender would suffer in the event of default.

Credit analysis involves a wide variety of financial analysis techniques, including ratio and trend analysis as well as the creation of projections and a detailed analysis of cash flows. Credit analysis also includes an examination of collateral and other sources of repayment as well as credit history and management ability. As mentioned, analysts attempt to predict the probability that a borrower will default on its debts, and also the severity of losses in the event of default. The credit spread is the difference in interest rates between theoretically "risk-free" investments such as U.S. treasuries or LIBOR and investments that carry some risk of default—reflect credit analysis by financial market participants.

Before approving a commercial loan, a bank will look at all of these factors with the primary emphasis being the cash flow of the borrower. A typical measurement of repayment ability is the debt service coverage ratio or DSCR. A credit analyst at a bank will measure the cash generated by a business (before interest expense and excluding depreciation and any other non-cash or extraordinary expenses). The DSCR divides this cash flow amount by the debt service (both principal and interest payments on all loans) that will be required to be met. Commercial bankers prefer a DSCR of at least 120 percent. In other words, the debt service coverage ratio should be 1.2 or higher to show that an extra cushion exists and that the business can afford its debt requirements.

== Classic credit analysis ==
Traditionally most banks have relied on subjective judgment to assess the credit risk of a corporate borrower. Essentially, bankers used information on various borrower characteristics – such as character (reputation), capital (leverage), capacity to pay (volatility of earnings), conditions of the customer's business (purpose of the loan), and collateral – in deciding whether or not to make a given loan. These characteristics are commonly referred to as the 5 Cs. Developing this type of expert system is time-consuming and expensive. Incorporating certain soft (qualitative) data in a risk model is particularly demanding, however successful implementation eliminates human error and reduces potential for misuse. That is why, from time to time, banks have tried to clone their decision-making process. Even so, in the granting of credit to corporate customers, many banks continue to rely primarily on their traditional expert system for evaluating potential borrowers.

== Credit scoring systems ==
In recent decades, a number of objective, quantitative systems for scoring credits have been developed. In univariate (one variable) accounting-based credit-scoring systems, the credit analyst compares various key accounting ratios of potential borrowers with industry or group norms and trends in these variables.

Today, Standard & Poor's, Moody's, and Risk Management Association can all provide banks with industry ratios. The univariate approach enables an analyst starting an inquiry to determine whether a particular ratio for a potential borrower differs markedly from the norm for its industry. In reality, however, the unsatisfactory level of one ratio is frequently mitigated by the strength of some other measure. A firm, for example, may have a poor profitability ratio but an above-average liquidity ratio. One limitation of the univariate approach is the difficulty of making trade-offs between such weak and strong ratios. Of course, a good credit analyst can make these adjustments. However, some univariate measures – such as the specific industry group, public versus private company, and region – are categorical rather than ratio-level values. It is more difficult to make judgments about variables of this type.

Although univariate models are still in use today in many banks, most academics and an increasing number of practitioners seem to disapprove of ratio analysis as a means of assessing the performance of a business enterprise. Many respected theorists downgrade the arbitrary rules of thumb (such as company ratio comparisons) that are widely used by practitioners and favor instead the application of more rigorous statistical techniques.

Fuzzy logic and neural networks are examples of novel methods of developing credit scoring expert systems that deliver greater accuracy in estimates of future performance of a business enterprise. Beside hard data present in traditional ratio analysis, fuzzy logic can easily incorporate linguistic terms and expert opinions which makes it more adapted to cases with insufficient and imprecise hard data, as well as for modeling risks that are not fully understood.

== Education and training ==
Typical education credentials often require a business related bachelor's degree majoring in finance, business, statistics, or accounting (to include an emphasis in finance or economics). An MBA is not required, however is increasingly being held or pursued by analysts, often to become more competitive for advancement opportunities. Commercial bankers also undergo intense credit training provided by their bank or a third-party company.
