= Dominic D'Alessandro =

- Born: January 18, 1947 (age 78); Frosolone, Molise, Italy
- Occupation: businessman
- Known for: Former CEO, Manulife
- Spouse: Pearl D'Alessandro

Dominic D'Alessandro, OC (born January 18, 1947) is a Canadian business executive. From January 1994, to May 2009, D'Alessandro was the president and CEO of Manulife Financial, a major insurance company and financial services provider. In May 2009, Donald Guloien, senior executive vice president and chief investment officer, succeeded D'Alessandro as president and CEO of Manulife Financial. On Nov. 12, 2009, D'Alessandro was appointed to join the board of directors at Suncor Energy Inc., Canada's largest energy company.

== Awards and recognition ==
D'Alessandro was given the title "Canada's Outstanding CEO of the Year" in 2002 by his peers for his contribution to business and the community and named an Officer of the Order of Canada in August 2003. Additionally, in 2004, he was given the title, "Canada's Most Respected CEO".

In November 2006, Prime Minister of Canada, Stephen Harper named D'Alessandro to the advisory committee on the Public Service of Canada, and in June 2006 appointed him to the North American Free Trade Agreement's (NAFTA) North American Competitiveness Council.

He received the International Distinguished Entrepreneur Award from the University of Manitoba in June 2007, and has also received the Canadian Business Leader Award from the Alberta School of Business, University of Alberta in March 2007, an honorary doctorate from York University in June 2006, a 2005 Horatio Alger Award, a Special Lifetime Management Achievement Award from McGill University in February 2005, Concordia University's Loyola Medal in May 2004, the University of Toronto's Arbour Award in September 1999, and an honorary doctorate from Concordia University in June 1998. D'Alessandro was also made a fellow of the Institute of Chartered Accountants in 1993.
