= Manulife Bank of Canada =

Canadian bank

Manulife Bank of Canada; Banque Manuvie du Canada
- Type: Subsidiary
- Industry: Banking
- Founded: 1993; 33 years ago
- Headquarters: Waterloo, Ontario, Canada
- Key people: Katy Boshart (CEO)
- Total assets: CA$ 29.5 billion (Q1 2024)
- Parent: Manulife
- Website: www.manulifebank.ca

Manulife Bank of Canada (operating as Manulife Bank; French: Banque Manuvie du Canada) is a wholly-owned subsidiary of Manulife. As a direct bank, it offers high-interest chequing & savings accounts, credit cards, lines of credit, and mortgages, including Manulife One. Since it was established in 1993, Manulife Bank has grown to more than $29 billion in assets and serves customers across Canada. Manulife Bank headquarters are in Waterloo, Ontario.

Manulife Bank distributes its products and services through independent financial advisors, mortgage brokers, and a Canada-wide network of more than 200 mortgage specialists.

Manulife Bank does not have any physical branches; however, customers can access their accounts using a mobile banking app, online banking, and Interactive Voice Response (IVR) telephone banking. In addition, customers can make debit purchases using their access cards, write cheques, and make surcharge-free Automated Banking Machine (ABM) transactions at thousands of ABMs across Canada through The Exchange Network.

Manulife Bank is a member of Canada Deposit Insurance Corporation (CDIC).

== History ==
Manulife Bank is a Schedule I federally chartered bank that was established on January 1, 1993, when Cabot Trust Company, Huronia Trust Company and the Regional Trust Company were merged by Manulife Financial. Its branch network was sold to the Laurentian Bank of Canada later in 1993 and it became Canada's first bank to sell its products through independent financial advisors.

In 1999, the Advantage Account was launched - a high-interest savings account.

In 1999, Manulife One was launched - Canada's first "all-in-one" account. Manulife One allowed Canadians to combine their mortgage and other debts with their chequing and savings accounts to simplify their banking and make their money work more efficiently.

In 2001, telephone and internet banking was introduced to provide customers with 24-hour self-service.

In 2003, the Business Advantage Account was launched - a high-interest account for small business owners.

In 2007, Manulife Bank opened an office in Halifax, Nova Scotia.

In 2009, Manulife Bank began offering Tax-Free Savings Accounts (TFSA).

In 2010, Manulife Bank established Manulife Trust Company (Manulife Trust) - a federally chartered trust company licenced to do business in all Canadian provinces and territories. Manulife Trust is a wholly owned subsidiary of Manulife Bank. Like its parent company, Manulife Bank, Manulife Trust is a member of the Canada Deposit Insurance Corporation (CDIC).

In 2015, Manulife Bank entered into a deal with Alimentation Couche-Tard to add ATM machines to 830 Mac's Convenience Stores, Circle K, and Couche-Tard locations.

In 2016, Manulife was fined by the Financial Transactions and Reports Analysis Centre of Canada (FINTRAC) for "violations [of] a technical nature". Manulife was originally levied a $1.5 million fine, which was subsequently reduced to $1.15 million.

In 2017, Manulife Bank launched the ManulifeMoney+ Visa Infinite and ManulifeMoney+ Visa Platinum Cards.

In 2019, Manulife Bank launched the All-In Banking Package, an integrated banking package and mobile app that rewards customers for saving money each month.

In 2022, Manulife Bank announced that Rick Lunny, president and CEO, will be retiring and stepping down at the end of February. Alex Lucas, who was head of Individual Insurance, Manulife Canada, took over beginning in March.

In 2024, Manulife Bank announced the departure of Alex Lucas and the appointment of Katy Boshart as its new chief executive officer. Boshart's previous role was at TD Bank, where she was the senior vice president and head of the customer engagement platform.

== See also ==
- List of banks in Canada
- Manulife Financial
