= Credit assistant =

A credit assistant is a person employed by an organization to provide support services to credit managers, credit analysts and other members of the credit department. This position is often entry level. Job responsibilities may include:

- Collections
- Gathering credit reports, financial histories and other data for credit analysts
- Verifying credit reference information
- Customer service

== Education and background ==
Credit assistants often hold associate degrees and/or have experience as collectors or accounts receivables clerks.

== Employment ==
The average salary for credit assistants in the United States is $36,216.

== Professional organizations ==
Credit assistants in the United States can obtain memberships, continuing education and certification through NACM. Certification levels include Credit Business Associate, Certified Credit and Risk Analyst, Credit Business Fellow, Certified Credit Executive, Certified International Credit Professional and International Certified Credit Executive.

== See also ==
- Credit analyst
- Credit manager
- Director of credit and collections
