= Credit Managers' Index =

The Credit Managers' Index (CMI) is a monthly economic indicator of financial activity reflecting credit managers' responses to levels of favorable and unfavorable factors. The measure has been sourced in stories from publications such as the Wall Street Journal, CFO and Bloomberg.

Tracked since February 2002, the CMI is produced by the National Association of Credit Management (NACM) and is currently conducted by Armada Corporate Intelligence's Chris Kuehl, who also serves as NACM's economic advisor. The CMI is compiled through a voluntary poll of credit and finance professionals in the service and manufacturing sectors. The CMI results generally are released on the last business day of each month.

A CMI number of more than 50 indicates an economy in expansion; less than 50 indicates contraction.

Unlike many economic indexes, the CMI resisted the month-to-month swings during the most recent economic downturn. The index accurately signaled that the economic plunge was stabilizing and beginning to recover from the recession.

The Chartered Institute of Credit Management (CICM) in the UK produces a similar Index on a quarterly basis reflecting its members' responses to questions about the same factors and it uses the same methodology.

== Methodology ==
The index is based on survey responses of approximately 1,000 trade credit managers in the second half of each month. There is typically an approximately equal representation between the manufacturing and service sectors. Respondents from throughout the United States are asked to comment on whether they are seeing improvement, deterioration, or no change for various favorable and unfavorable factors.

The computation of seasonality is based on the formula used by the U.S. Census Bureau and most of the federal government's statistical gathering apparatus. This is designed to streamline comparisons between the CMI diffusion index and comparable indices.
