= Credit analyst =

Person employed to analyze the credit worthiness

A credit analyst is a person employed by an organization to analyze the credit worthiness of customers and potential customers, and to assist in the ongoing management, classification and quantification of credit risk thereafter. See Credit analysis § Role and Financial analyst § Corporate and other for discussion. In May 2015, the U.S. Bureau of Labor Statistics reported 70,840 people employed as credit analysts. The salary for this position ranged from $40,250 to $134,080 with a mean average wage of $79,720.

== Job responsibilities ==
Job responsibilities include the following:

- Reviewing credit applications
- Projecting sales
- Evaluating credit risk
- Analyzing financial data, statements and trends
- Setting new customer credit limits
- Recommending credit limits based on company credit policies
- Performing credit reviews of existing customers
- Maintaining customer files with financial statements and bank reference information
- Resolving credit issues
- Monitoring risk trends on behalf of management and sales personnel

== Education ==
Credit analysts typically hold a business related bachelor's degree majoring in finance, in accounting, in business administration, or in economics. Depending on the role, some companies may require a professional certification such as the Credit Business Associate from the National Association of Credit Management (NACM).

Particularly for analysis involving the technical elements of EAD, PD and LGD modelling, some quantitative training, specifically in statistics and calculus, will be required. Often, a math or actuarial degree, and / or the FRM or PRM certification may be recommended. See also Quantitative analysis (finance) § Education.

== Professional organizations ==
Credit analysts in the United States can obtain memberships, continuing education and certification through NACM. Certification levels include Credit Business Associate, Certified Credit and Risk Analyst, Credit Business Fellow, Certified Credit Executive, Certified International Credit Professional and International Certified Credit Executive.

== See also ==
- Credit assistant
- Credit manager
- Director of credit and collections
- Financial analyst
