= Robert Astley =

Canadian actuary (born 1944)

Robert Murray Astley
- Born: December 26, 1944 (age 81)
- Education: B.Sc. (Hons.), University of Manitoba
- Occupations: Business executive, actuary
- Known for: Chair of the Canada Pension Plan Investment Board
- Title: Former Chair, CPP Investment Board
- Board member of: Canada Pension Plan Investment Board; Bank of Montreal
- Honors: Fellow, Canadian Institute of Actuaries

Robert Murray Astley (born 26 December 1944), a Fellow of the Canadian Institute of Actuaries, was the chairman of the Canada Pension Plan Investment Board.

== Biography ==
Astley has been a director of the CPP Investment Board since September 2006, and succeeded its Chairmen of the Board, Gail Cook-Bennett, effective October 2008.

Astley is also a Director of the Bank of Montreal and chairman of its human resources and management compensation committee.

Astley was formerly the president of Sun Life Financial Canada, president and CEO of Clarica Life Insurance Company, chair of Canadian Life and Health Insurance Association. In 2004 he was succeeded by Kevin Dougherty. Astley is also a former Chair of Wilfrid Laurier University, a former member of the Dean’s Advisory Council, Laurier School of Business & Economics and a former Chair of the K-W Symphony.

Astley graduated from the University of Manitoba with an Honours degree in Science.

== Defamation suit ==
On May 31, 2011, the Toronto Star reported that Astley won $650,000 in a defamation suit against shareholder activist, Robert Verdun before the Ontario Superior Court of Justice. The court found that Robert Verdun had defamed Astley through repeated public accusations and writings, including emails, shareholder proposals, and a self-published book. The court also prohibited Verdun to publish any statements about Astley.

Business positions
Preceded by Gail Cook-Bennett	CPP Investment Board Chairman; 2008-present	Succeeded by incumbent
Business positions
Preceded by	Sun Life Financial Canada CEO -2004	Succeeded by Kevin Dougherty
