= Mutual Life =

Canadian insurance company (1868–2002)

- Formerly: Ontario Mutual Life Assurance Company (1868–1900)
- Type: Mutual (1868–1999); Public (1999–2002)
- Industry: Life insurance
- Founded: 19 December 1868
- Defunct: 31 December 2002
- Fate: Acquired by Sun Life
- Headquarters: 227 King Street South, Waterloo, Ontario

The Mutual Life Assurance Company of Canada was a Canadian life insurance company that existed from 1868 to 2002. The company's articles of incorporation received royal assent in the Parliament of Ontario on 19 December 1868 as the Ontario Mutual Life Assurance Company. In 1900, it changed its name to the Mutual Life Assurance Company of Canada.

At the end of the 20th century, Mutual Life was Canada's fourth largest insurance company. On 10 June 1999, shareholders voted to demutualise the company and to change its name to the Clarica Life Insurance Company. Clarica determined a valuation of CAD 865 million, and on 15 July 1999 made its initial public offering of 42.2 million shares valued at CAD 20.50 per.

In December 2001, Sun Life made a CAD 7.1 billion offer to acquire Clarica. Shareholders voted in favour of the takeover on 6 March 2002, and the deal was completed on 29 May. Upon the purchase, Sun Life overtook Manulife to become Canada's largest insurance company. After the sale, Clarica was merged into the Sun Life Assurance Company of Canada, and the corporation was dissolved at the end of 2002. That year, Sun transferred the headquarters of its Canadian operations from Toronto to Waterloo, where they remain today. Sun Life continued using the Clarica brand for another 5 years until retiring it in 2007.

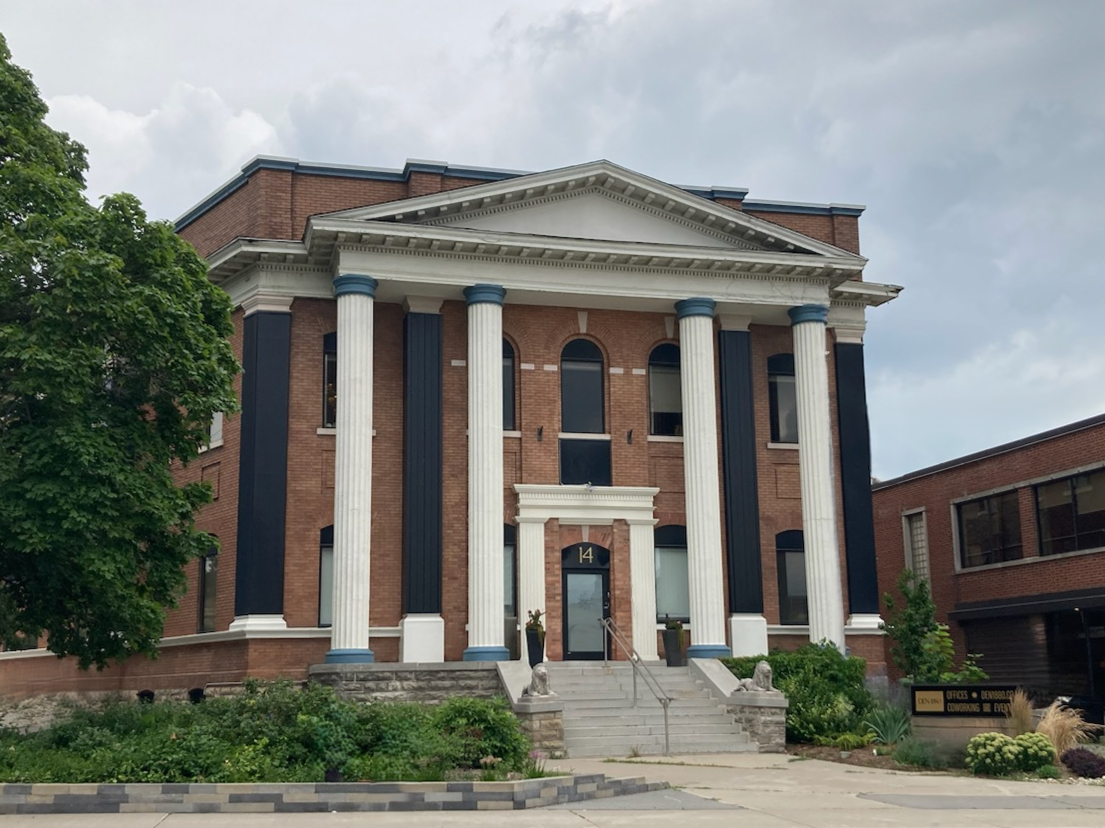
The 1879 Mutual Life Building at 14 Erb Street West, designed by David W. Gingrich. It was the company's headquarters until 1912.

== Leadership ==
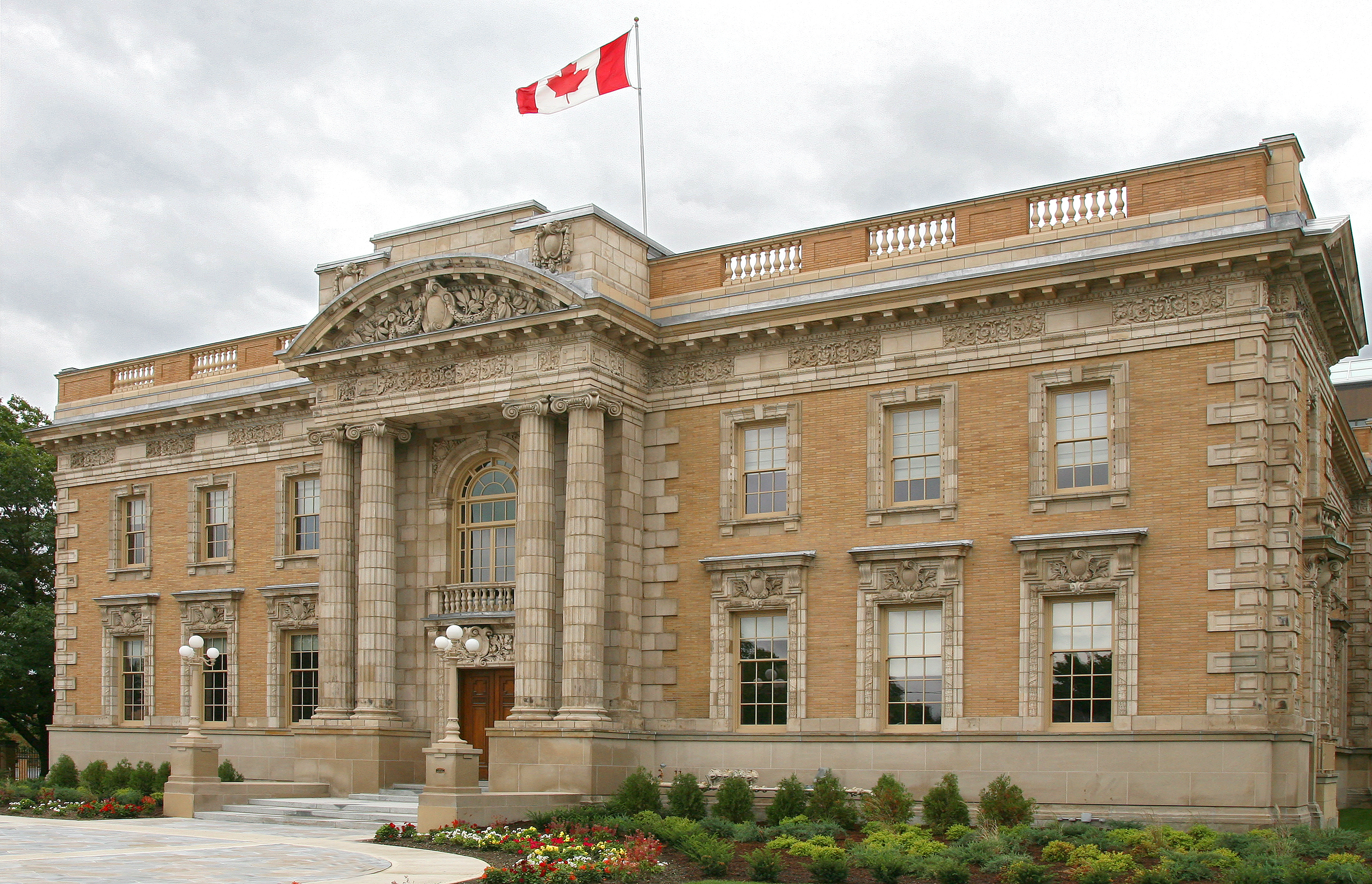
Mutual Life's new head office opened on Monday, 13 May 1912. It was designed by Darling and Pearson of Toronto.

=== President ===
1. Isaac Erb Bowman, 1869–1897
2. Robert Melvin, 1897–1908
3. Edwin Perry Clement, 1908–1920
4. Maj. Hume Blake Cronyn Sr., 1920–1929
5. Robert Osborne McCulloch, 1929–1943
6. Louis Lacourse Lang, 1943–1958
7. Harrington Luke Guy, 1958–1959
8. Edward Anthes Rieder, 1959–1964
9. Kenneth Robert MacGregor, 1964–1973
10. John Harry Panabaker, 1973–1982
11. Jack Verner Masterman, 1982–1989
12. Robert Murray Astley, 1989–2002

=== Chairman of the Board ===
1. Charles Martin Bowman, 1926–1932
2. Robert Osborne McCulloch, 1943
3. Louis Lacourse Lang, 1958–1964
4. Edward Anthes Rieder, 1964–1966
5. Harold Melvin Turner, 1966–1973
6. Kenneth Robert MacGregor, 1973–1982
7. John Harry Panabaker, 1982–1989
8. Jack Verner Masterman, 1989–1999
9. David Alison Ganong, 1999–2002
