= J Robert Verdun =

Canadian advocate

- Occupation: Book author
- Known for: shareholders-rights advocate

J Robert Verdun is a Canadian activist shareholder-rights advocate, an author and a former editor of a weekly paper. He was also a defendant in an important defamation lawsuit.

== North Waterloo Publishing ==
Verdun was the founder or North Waterloo Publishing Ltd., the publisher (among other titles) of the weekly paper Elmira Independent, of which he was Editor from 1974 to 1999. In 1990, the Independent was the winner of the Michener Award "for its blanket coverage of a prolonged legal battle over contamination of the Elmira-St. Jacobs municipal water supply." In 1999 he sold the newspaper to Torstar when David Galloway was Torstar's CEO.

Galloway later became a witness against Verdun in the defamation lawsuit.

== Shareholder advocate ==
Since the 1990s Verdun has been attending a dozen or so annual shareholders' meetings a year. He has been instrumental in introducing several measures that benefit small investors in public companies. Amongst his accomplishments:

- Introduction of the Cost of Management Ratio:

The ratio of between the compensation of a corporation's top five executives and its profits, a measure that aims to increase compensation disclosure for the benefit of the company’s shareholders.

- Separation of chair and CEO:

Before Verdun became active it was very common for Canadian public corporations to have the same person act both as the Chairman of its Board and its Chief Executive Officer, a clear case of a Conflict of Interest. For example BCE Inc, one of Canada's largest corporations, had the same person acting as chairman and CEO when Jean Monty held both these positions.

Verdun has been successful in convincing several public companies to produce more transparent financial statements and allow more democracy in board elections. He has done this through the inclusion of proposals in shareholder circulars, which became a standard after the Quebec Superior Court decision ordering the National Bank of Canada and RBC to print shareholder proposals in their proxy statements prior to their annual general meetings.

Verdun has been attending shareholders meetings of banks, insurance companies and others such as Nortel Networks for well over a decade and has attempted to make board of directors more accountable to the small investors who hold shares in these public companies. He has also appeared in legislative hearings before the legislative assembly of Ontario, Canada.

== The Fox in Charge ==
Verdun published a book, The Fox in Charge of the Biggest Henhouse in Canada, which is not available for sale after a defamation suit was brought against Verdun by Robert Astley, who was chair of the board of the Canada Pension Plan Investment Board (CPPIB) and a director of the Bank of Montreal. The book cannot be published, circulated or promoted due to a June 14, 2011, Order of the Superior Court of Justice in the case of Astley v. Verdun. Under the order, Verdun is prohibited from publishing or causing to be published, or otherwise disseminating or distributing in any manner whatsoever, this book or any statements or other communications which refer to Robert Astley by name, depiction or description.

== Defamation case ==
On May 20, 2011, a jury in the Ontario Superior Court of Justice found that Verdun had defamed Astley on eight occasions, and that the defamation was done with malice. The jury awarded damages against Verdun in the amount of $650,000, and the trial judge ordered a very broad permanent injunction against Verdun from publishing anything about Astley. Verdun's counterclaim against Astley were earlier dismissed by the court, and his appeals regarding his counterclaim were dismissed at both the Court of Appeal for Ontario and the Supreme Court of Canada.
