= John Bertram Stirling =

Canadian engineer (1888–1988)

- Born: 29 November 1888; Dundas, Ontario
- Died: 20 June 1988 (aged 99); Montreal, Quebec
- Education: Queen's University (BA '09, BSc '11)
- Spouse(s): Edith Carey Goodwin (m. 1920; died 1923) Emily Parker Sturdee (m. 1928; died 1987)
- Military career
- Branch: Canadian Army
- Service years: 1915–19
- Unit: Royal Canadian Engineers
- Conflicts: World War I

John Bertram Stirling (29 November 1888 – 20 June 1988) was a Canadian engineer and businessman who served as Chancellor of Queen's University (1960–1974).

== Biography ==
Stirling was born in Dundas, Ontario and educated at Queen's University (BA 1909, BSc 1911, LLD 1951), where he was a founding member of the Queen's Bands. He served with the Canadian Engineers in France during World War I. As an engineer, he became president of the Montreal-based EGM Cape and Company Ltd. He was president of the Engineering Institute of Canada, the Montreal Board of Trade and the Canadian Construction Association.

He served as Chancellor of Queen's in 1960–1974, retiring at the age of 86. He received the Sir John Kennedy Medal in 1954 and the Order of Canada in 1969. Stirling Hall at Queen's, the physics building, is named in his memory.

Academic offices
Preceded by Charles Avery Dunning	Chancellor of Queen's University; 1960–1973	Succeeded by Roland Michener
