= Gail Cook-Bennett =

Canadian economist and corporate advisor

- Born: Ottawa, Canada

Academic background
- Education: Carleton University (BA, MA); University of Michigan (PhD)

Academic work
- Discipline: Economics, corporate governance, public policy
- Institutions: University of Toronto; C.D. Howe Institute; Canada Pension Plan Investment Board; Manulife
- Awards: Order of Canada

Gail Cook-Bennett is a Canadian economist and corporate advisor. She has served on the Boards of Manulife Financial. and Canada Pension Plan Investment Board. She is a Member of the Order of Canada and has been recognized as one of Canada's Most Powerful Women Top 100.

== Early life and education ==
Cook-Bennett was born in Ottawa and graduated from Carleton University with a Bachelor of Arts (Honours) degree in economics in 1962 and a Masters of Economics in 1965. She obtained her Ph.D. in economics from the University of Michigan in 1968. She holds honorary degrees from Carleton University and York University and is a Fellow of the Institute of Corporate Directors. of Corporate Directors

== Career ==
Upon receiving her doctorate from the University of Michigan she began teaching at the University of Toronto (1968–74). She later served as Executive Vice President of the C.D. Howe Institute in Montreal (1974–78) and as Vice Chair of Bennecon Ltd., Management Consultants (1982-1998). In 1998 she became the founding Chair of the Canada Pension Plan Investment Board (CPPIB) where she served for 10 years. She was then appointed Chair of Manulife Financial from 2008 to 2013. Since 2014 she has served as chair for the Institute of Corporate Directors.

In addition to her work in the private sector, she has served on several Crown, professional and not-for-profit boards. While a member of the Board of the Bank of Canada, she chaired the Special Committee of the Board charged with appointing both its Governor and Senior Deputy Governor of the Bank of Canada. She has chaired the General Services Sectoral Advisory Group to the Minister of International Trade and was a member of The Advisory Committee on Financing (providing advice to the Federal Minister of Finance) and served on the Canadian delegation to the Trilateral Commission.
