= Manulife =

Canadian multinational insurance and financial services company

Manulife Financial Corporation

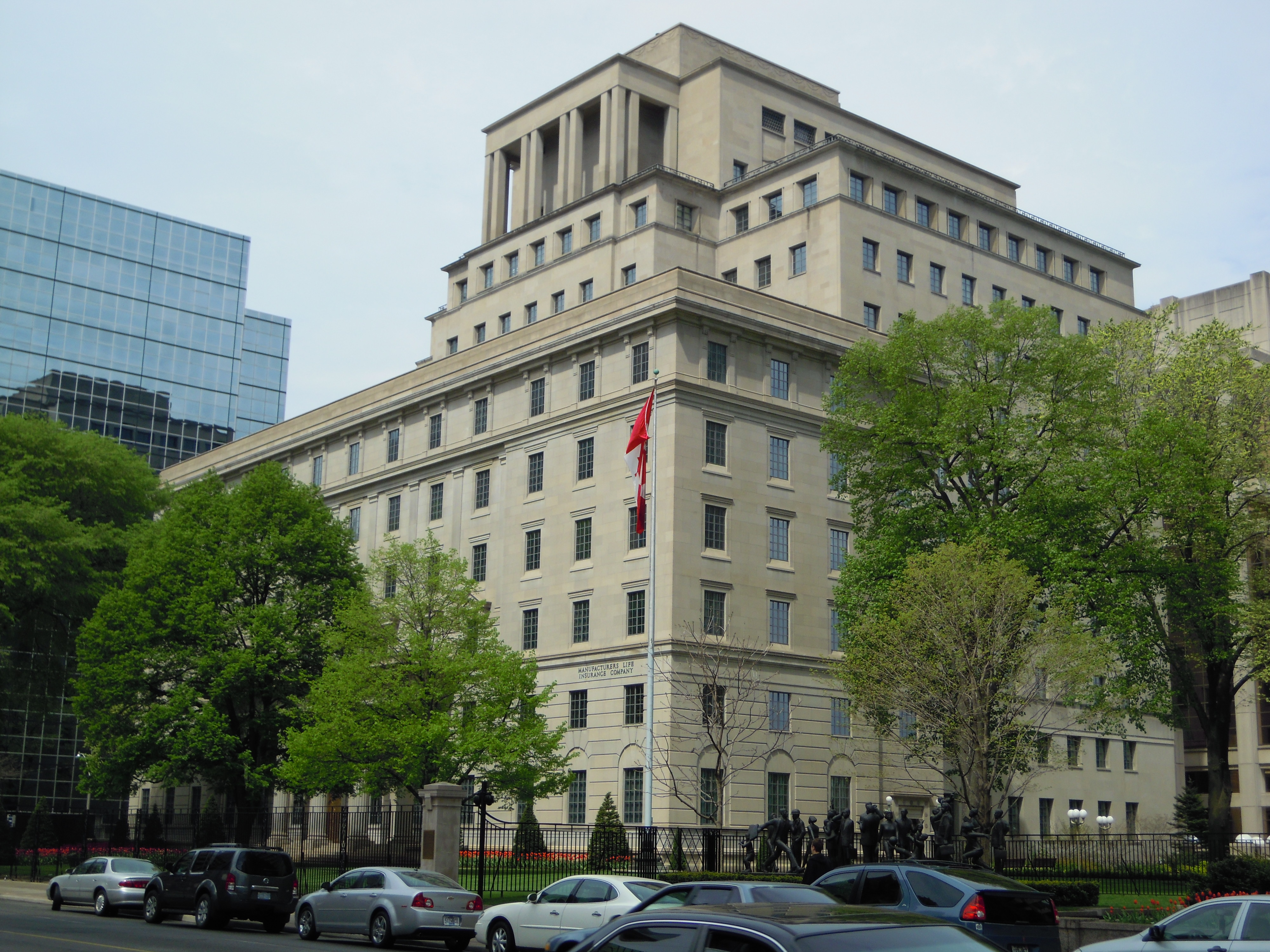
- Manulife headquarters on Bloor Street in Downtown Toronto
- Formerly: Manufacturers Life Insurance Company
- Type: Public
- Traded as: TSX: MFC; NYSE: MFC; SEHK: 945; PSE: MFC
- Industry: Financial services (insurance)
- Founded: June 23, 1887; 139 years ago
- Headquarters: 200 Bloor Street East; Toronto, Ontario, Canada; M4W 1E5
- Area served: North America; Asia
- Key people: Roy Gori (former president and chief executive officer); John Cassava (chairman of the board of directors); Naveed Irshad (former CEO of Canadian operations)
- Products: Asset management, Commercial banking, Commercial mortgages, Consumer banking, Group benefits, Insurance, Investments, Mutual funds, Private banking, Real estate, Reinsurance, Securities, Underwriting, Wealth management
- Revenue: ▼CA$39.0 billion (2018)
- Net income: ▲CA$5.9 billion (2020)
- AUM: ▲CA$1.084 trillion (2018)
- Total assets: ▲CA$750.3 billion (2018)
- Total equity: ▲CA$47.2 billion (2018)
- Number of employees: 34,000 employees and 63,000 agents (2015)
- Subsidiaries: John Hancock Financial; Manulife Investment Management; Manulife Bank of Canada
- Website: www.manulife.com

Manulife Financial Corporation (French: Financière Manuvie) is a Canadian multinational insurance company and financial services provider headquartered in Toronto, Ontario. The company operates in Canada and Asia as "Manulife" and in the United States primarily through its John Hancock Financial division. As of December 2021, the company employed approximately 38,000 people and had 119,000 agents under contract, and has CA$1.4 trillion in assets under management and administration. Manulife at one point serviced over 26 million customers worldwide.

Manulife is the largest insurance company in Canada and the 28th largest fund manager in the world based on worldwide institutional assets under management (AUM).

Manulife Bank of Canada is a wholly-owned subsidiary of Manulife.

== History ==
Manulife was incorporated as "The Manufacturers Life Insurance Company" by Act of Parliament on June 23, 1887, and was headed by Canada's prime minister, John A. Macdonald, and Ontario's lieutenant-governor, Alexander Campbell (there were no conflict-of-interest guidelines at the time and it was not unusual for public persons to be involved in private industry). The idea for the company came from J. B. Carlile, who came to Canada as an agent for The North American Life Assurance Company. It was his firsthand experience on which the new company's product portfolio was based.

=== Private stock company ===
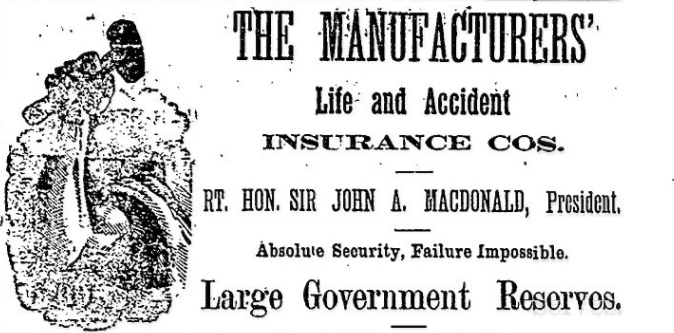
An 1890 ad for the insurance company, boasting of the Right Honourable John A. Macdonald's access to "Large Government Reserves".

The firm was founded as The Manufacturers Life Insurance Company in 1887. Its first president was John A. Macdonald, the first Prime Minister of Canada. By 1890 the company sought to add additional financier support, appointing prominent Toronto businessmen W.G. Gooderham and Edward Roper Curzon Clarkson, whose accounting firm Clarkson Gordon & Co provided the auditing services for the company. The company sold its first policy outside of Canada in Bermuda in 1893, where the company had opened its first auxiliary agency the same year. In 1894, policies were sold in Grenada, Jamaica and Barbados; Trinidad and Tobago, and Haiti in 1895; and British Honduras, British Guiana, China and British Hong Kong in 1897.

In 1901, Manulife amalgamated with the Temperance and General Life Assurance Company, a Toronto-based Canadian life insurer that provided preferred rates to abstainers of alcohol. Manulife continued to offer abstainers rates into the 1920s.

In 1931, it opened its first southern China branch in British Hong Kong. Shortly thereafter, it established itself as a leading life insurer in the region with branches in Macau, Shantou and Amoy.

=== Mutual company ===
In 1958, shareholders voted to change its legal form from a joint stock company to a mutual organization, making the company privately owned by its policyholders.

In 1984, Manulife announced that it had acquired Waterloo, Ontario-based Dominion Life Assurance Company, a deal that included the purchase of all of the outstanding stock of the company from Lincoln National. Dominion Life was founded in Waterloo in 1889, and Manulife made a commitment to the community to retain a significant presence in Waterloo. In 1988, Manulife opened a new five-storey office building at 500 King Street North in Waterloo to house its Canadian Division.

In 1996, the company entered an agreement with Sinochem to form Shanghai-based Zhong Hong Life Insurance Co. Ltd., China's first joint venture life insurance company, and was granted a license that made it the second foreign insurer to be allowed re-entry into China. That same year, the company amalgamated with North American Life.

=== Demutualization and public company ===
In 1999, its voting eligible policyholders approved demutualization, and the shares of Manulife, the holding company of The Manufacturers Life Insurance Company and its subsidiaries, began trading on The Toronto Stock Exchange (TSX), the New York Stock Exchange (NYSE) and the Philippine Stock Exchange (PSE) under the ticker "MFC", and on The Stock Exchange of Hong Kong (SEHK) under the ticker "945".

In 2002, Manulife–Sinochem Life Insurance Co. Ltd. was granted approval by the China Insurance Regulatory Commission (CIRC) to open a branch office in Guangzhou, China, the first branch license granted to a foreign invested joint–venture life insurance company.

In 2003, Manulife-Sinochem received approval for a branch office in Beijing, the first multiple-branch license granted to a foreign-invested joint venture life insurance company. The firm is now licensed to operate in more than 50 Chinese cities. On September 29, 2003, Manulife announced its intent to acquire the Boston-based insurance company John Hancock Financial (including a Canadian subsidiary, Maritime Life) for $10.4 billion in a stock-for-stock merger. The merged entity would initially be led by John Hancock's CEO David F. D'Alessandro, but he would step down in June 2004.

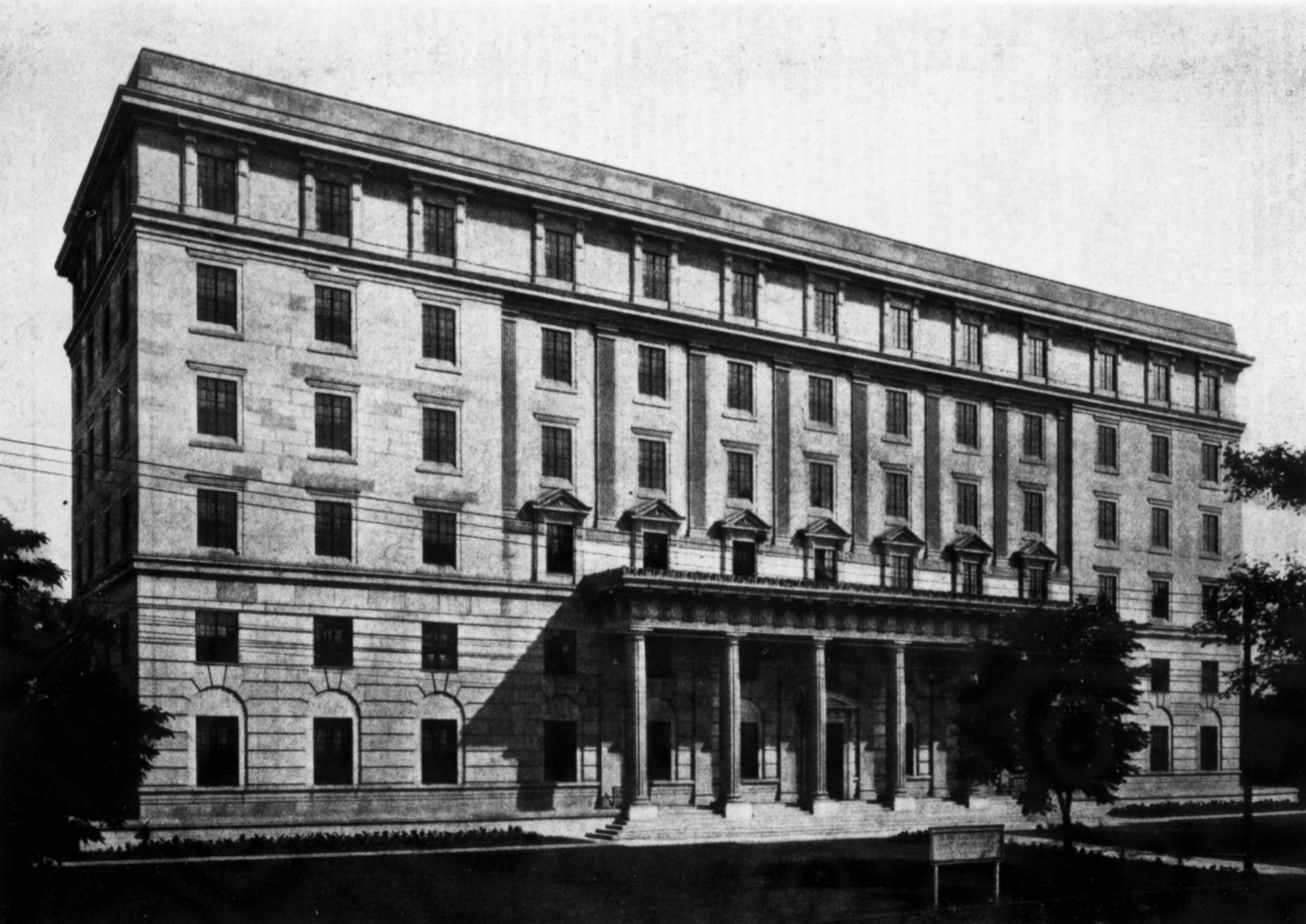
The 1925 head office on Bloor, designed by Sproatt & Rolph

In 2008, Manulife announced that Gail Cook-Bennett would become the first female chair of the board. Cook-Bennett was the first female board member of the company appointed in 1978.

In September 2009, the company purchased AIC's Canadian retail investment fund business. In October 2009, it purchased Pottruff & Smith Travel Insurance Brokers Inc., a Canadian broker and third party administrator of travel insurance.

In 2010, the company announced that it had purchased Fortis Bank SA/NV's 49% ownership in ABN AMRO TEDA Fund Management Co. Ltd. The new joint venture, Manulife TEDA Fund Management Company Ltd. (Manulife TEDA), provides traditional retail and institutional asset management for clients in China. The other 51 percent is owned by Northern International Trust, part of Tianjin TEDA Investment Holding Co., Ltd. (TEDA).

In June 2012, the company opened Manulife Cambodia, with headquarters in Phnom Penh.

In 2013, Richard DeWolfe became the chair of the company's board, succeeding Gail Cook-Bennett, who retired after serving 34 years on the board. In 2009, Donald Guloien, the chief investment officer, succeeded Dominic D'Alessandro as president and CEO of the company. Shortly before his departure, D'Alessandro modified his retirement package; the restricted units would only vest for a total of $10 million if the shares reached $36 by the end of 2011, and he would receive $5 million if the shares hit $30. This was in response to shareholders' reaction to the first quarterly loss ever posted by the firm in its public history. Under Guloien's leadership, the first initiatives were a dividend cut and an equity offering to bolster Manulife's capital levels, making it difficult for the share price to reach the target levels needed to vest.

In 2014, Manulife Financial simplified its logo and brand to refer to itself only as Manulife outside of the United States. In September of that year, Manulife agreed to acquire the Canadian operations of Standard Life for a fee of around US$3.7 billion.

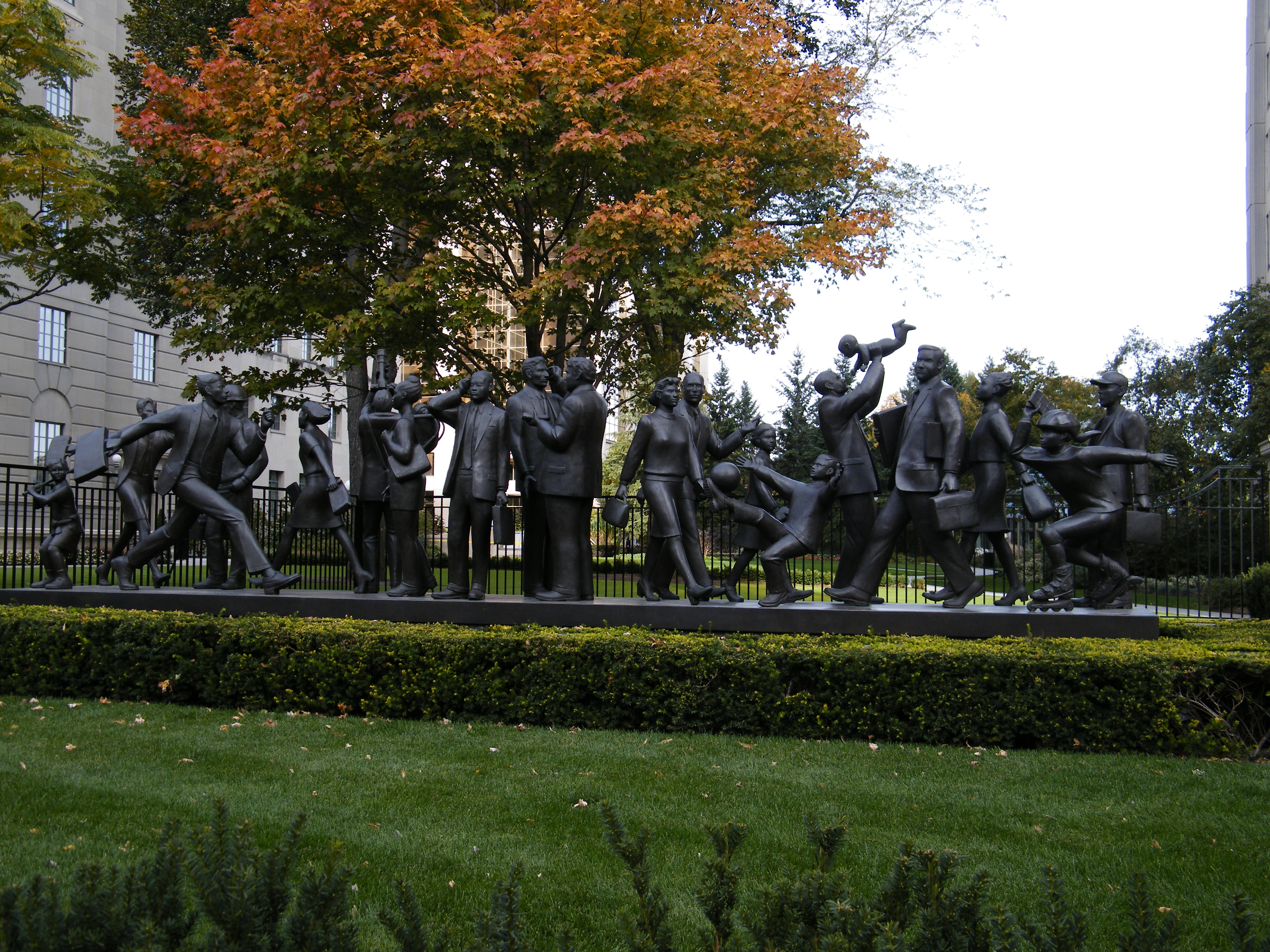
"Community" commissioned by Manulife Financial by Kirk Newman (2001) - Toronto, Canada

In April 2015, the company announced a partnership with DBS Bank, providing Manulife exclusive access to DBS customers in Singapore, Hong Kong, mainland China and Indonesia in exchange for an initial payment of US$1.2 billion.

In June 2015, Manulife-Sinochem became the first foreign invested joint-venture life insurance company in China authorized to sell mutual funds.

In April 2016, Manulife became the first Canadian insurance company to offer life insurance to people who are HIV-positive, insuring people who have tested HIV-positive, who are between the ages of 30 and 65, and meet certain other criteria for life insurance policies that would pay up to $2 million upon death.

In May 2016, Manulife US real estate investment trust became a public company via an initial public offering on the Singapore Exchange.

In April 2020, Manulife bought 49% of then privately held Mahindra AMC of India and renamed the JV Mahindra Manulife Investment Management Company.

== Governance ==
=== President ===
Manulife has had 14 presidents. Members of Toronto's Gooderham family have run the company for a combined 47 years of its history.

1. Sir John A. Macdonald, 1887–1891
2. George Gooderham, 1891–1901
3. Sir George William Ross, 1901–1914
4. William George Gooderham, 1914–1935
5. Melville Ross Gooderham, 1935–1951
6. James Hector Lithgow, 1951–1956
7. George Llewellyn Holmes, 1956–1963
8. Alfred Thomas Seedhouse, 1963–1972
9. Edwin Sydney Jackson, 1972–1985
10. Thomas Anthony Di Giacomo, 1985–1993
11. Dominic D'Alessandro, 1994–2009
12. Donald A. Guloien, 2009–2017
13. Roy Gori, 2017–2025
14. Philip James Witherington, 2025–present

=== Chairman of the Board ===
The office of chairman of the board was created 1 January 1956 for outgoing president J. H. Lithgow. The first five chairmen had served previously as president. Since 1994, the chairman has been a non-executive post held by an independent director.

1. James Hector Lithgow, 1956–1959
2. George Llewellyn Holmes, 1964–1971
3. Alfred Thomas Seedhouse, 1972–1978
4. Edwin Sydney Jackson, 1985–1990
5. Thomas Anthony Di Giacomo, 1990–1993
6. William R. C. Blundell, 1994–1998
7. Arthur R. Sawchuk, 1998–2008
8. Gail Cook-Bennett, 2008–2013
9. Richard B. DeWolfe, 2013–2018
10. John M. Cassaday, 2018–2023
11. Donald R. Lindsay, 2023–

== Controversies ==
=== Failure to disclose information on suspicious transactions (2017) ===
Manulife paid the $1.15 million penalty levied on its bank subsidiary for failing to disclose information on suspicious transactions. The Financial Transactions and Reports Analysis Centre of Canada (FINTRAC) imposed the penalty on Manulife Bank of Canada, alleging that the bank failed to file a suspicious transaction report, which was designed under the Proceeds of Crime (Money laundering) and Terrorist Financing Act to detect criminal activity.

=== Data privacy issues (2023) ===
In an interview with Go Public, a Manulife insider claimed there were major privacy issues within the company's Canadian banking division that have potentially put thousands of customers at risk.

According to that insider, whose identity wasn't revealed, customers' bank account information and other personal details – millions of names, addresses, account details, social insurance and credit card numbers, birth dates and transactions among other things – could be widely seen in a database with few privacy protections in place – accessed by more than 100 employees and shared with an unknown number of others. Go Public has also obtained an internal Manulife report written in the spring of 2021 that mirrors the insider's concerns. It documents data and privacy issues with that database, which at that point had existed for almost a decade.
