= Canadian Construction Association =

Canadian trade association

- Formerly: Association of Canadian Building and Construction Industries (1918–28)
- Founded: 26 November 1918 (founded); 16 September 1919 (incorporated)
- Headquarters: 250 Albert Street, Suite 300, Ottawa, Ontario
- Website: cca-acc.com

The Canadian Construction Association is a Canadian trade association that has existed since 1918. The association was founded immediately after World War I by Montreal contractor J. P. Anglin. At the time of the association's formation, the Canadian construction industry was poorly organised and had little in the way of standards and conventions. At its inception, the body served to advocate with the government, develop standard practices within the industry, and raise the profile of construction in Canada. Originally, it was called the Association of Canadian Building and Construction Industries, and adopted its present name in 1928.

The CCA has been based in Ottawa since it was formed. From 1955 to 1975 it occupied a building of its own, but since that time has rented office space. Over its lifetime, the CCA's mission has remained mostly unchanged. The CCA serves as the primary advocate for the industry with the federal government and liaises with government departments and officials on relevant policy matters.

== History ==
The formation of the Canadian Construction Association was the idea of James Penrose Anglin (1876–1932). Anglin, originally of Kingston, Ontario, began as an apprentice carpenter in 1889, and in 1893 worked as a carpenter at the World's Columbian Exposition in Chicago. In 1898, he moved to Montreal where he became an assistant to architect Robert Findlay. In 1901 he joined the head office of the Bank of Montreal as architect's superintendent, and in 1905 organised and became supervisor of the bank's architectural department. Anglin left the bank in 1907 and entered the contracting business. In 1913 he formed Anglin's Limited. In May 1919 he took over the Canadian operations of Norcross Brothers and formed Anglin-Norcross Limited, of which he became president.

During the week of 7 October 1918, a group of eastern contractors held a conference in Ottawa. At the conference, the attendees agreed upon the need for a national construction organisation to provide standarisation and advocacy for the industry. A conference to form the association, given the provisional name of the "Canadian Association of Building Industries," was called for 22-24 October and invitations were extended nationally. The officers of the convention were J. P Anglin (president), D. K. Trotter (secretary), and George Crain (treasurer). The conference would end up being pushed to November.

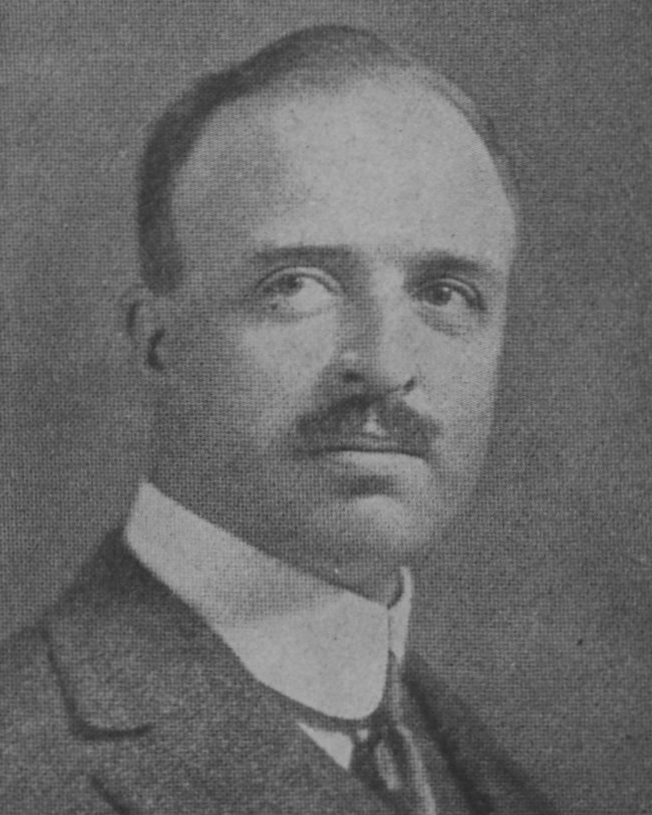
James Penrose Anglin (1876–1932), the founder of the CCA

The first conference of the provisional association was held on 26 November 1918, a mere fifteen days after Armistice Day, at the Château Laurier in Ottawa. There were 191 delegates at the meeting, of whom 65 were general contractors, 34 were sub-contractors, and 92 were materials suppliers. The meeting had several purposes. First, the war had created a feeling of national solidarity, and the construction industry wished to play an active role in building post-war Canada. Second, approximately $1 billion of construction had been deferred due to the war, and contractors wanted the work to be released. And third, members wished to improve the image of the industry and create industry standards.

Earlier in November 1918, the Associated General Contractors of America was formed in Chicago. Prior to the Canadian meeting, the AGCA's president Daniel A. Garber sent a telegram to the Canadians inviting them to join the American group rather than form a new association. The invitation was declined. On the Wednesday morning of the conference, the committee on permanent organisation presented a resolution to establish a national construction organisation named the "Association of Canadian Building Industries." The resolution passed with the name amended to the Association of Canadian Building and Construction Industries."

At its inception, the association was organised into three separate sections for general contractors, trade contractors, and manufacturers and suppliers. Although it was not recognised formally, the association held an understanding that its president would come from the general contractors section.

Following the inaugural meeting, the Association met with members of parliament Sir Thomas White, Frank Carvell, and John Reid to provide recommendations concerning the industry. The Association submitted eight resolutions that had been decided the previous day, and the government representatives promised to consider all the requests. The month after the conference, The Canadian Engineer published an extensive report on the proceedings of the meeting. On 5-6 March 1919, the National Council met in Toronto to plan the association in detail.

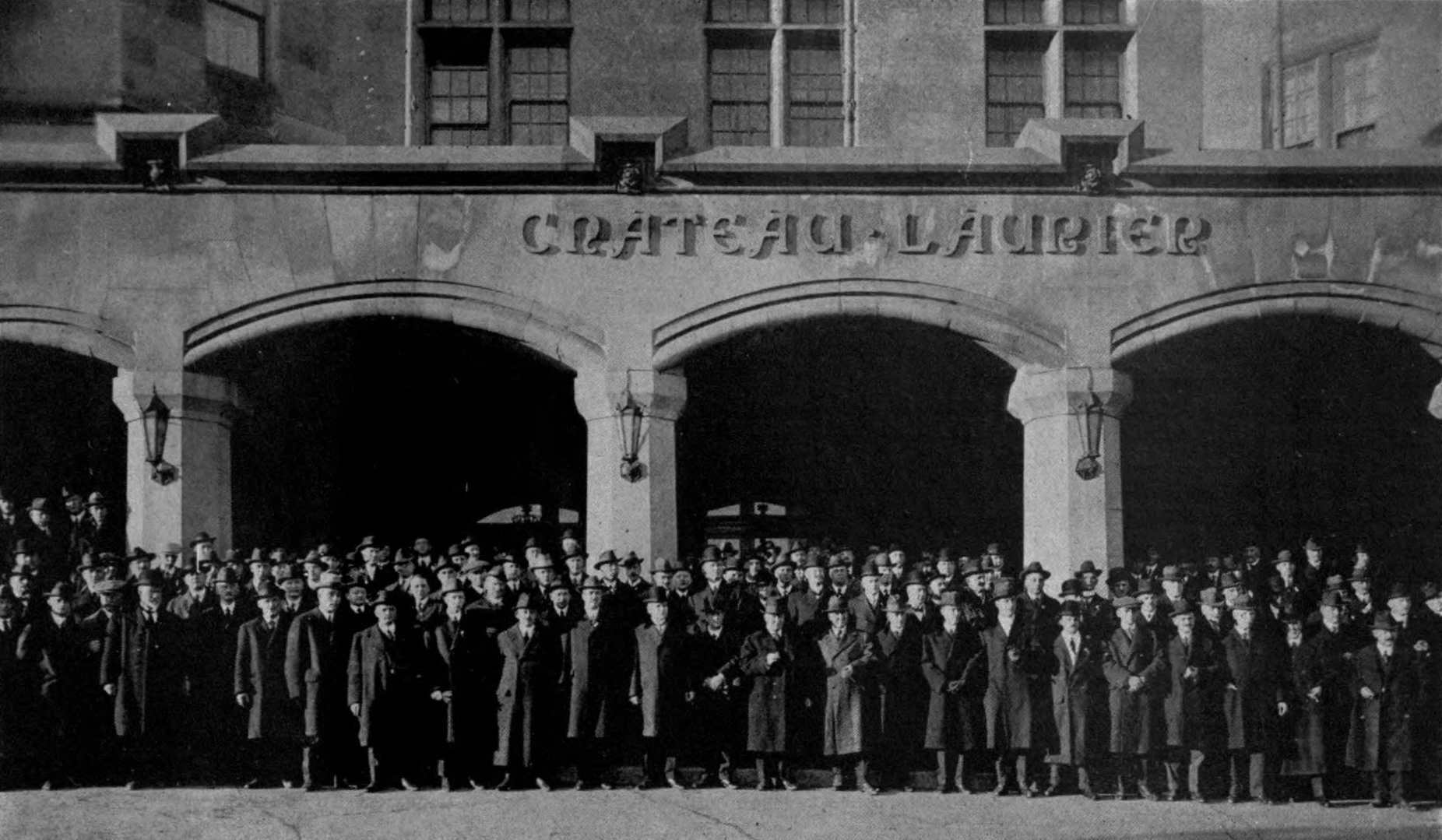
Delegates at the inaugural conference in November 1918 at the Château Laurier in Ottawa

Early in 1919, the Association determined it required the services of a permanent secretary, who would be based in Ottawa. A newspaper advertisement for the position stated that "preference will be given to young men who have had engineering education and construction experience; good salary to the right man; headquarters will be Ottawa; must be good organizer." The first man to be hired as secretary manager was Arthur Simmons Clarson (1861–1939) of Montreal. Clarson remained in the role for only a short time. At some point in late 1919, he was replaced by the Rev. John Clark Reilly (1881–1956). Reilly had graduated from Stanstead College and McGill University. Upon graduation he attended Andover Theological Seminary and Harvard Divinity School, and in 1912 was ordained a minister in the Methodist Church. After serving overseas with the YMCA during World War I, he was unable to find a vacant church, so took the job with the ACBCI. On 16 September 1919, the association received a federal charter. The second conference had been intended to take place in the autumn of 1919. However, the Winnipeg general strike and its aftermath caused the second conference to be delayed until the following spring. The Association's second meeting took place from 2-4 March 1920, again at the Château Laurier. At this second conference, only 86 were in attendance. During the conference, updates were given on the progress of the constitution and bylaws. The association would be run by a national executive with around 50 members, which in turn was controlled by an executive committee consisting of the president, two vice-presidents, secretary, treasurer, and the three section chairmen. Membership was divided into individual and group categories. The association's bylaws specified four objectives:

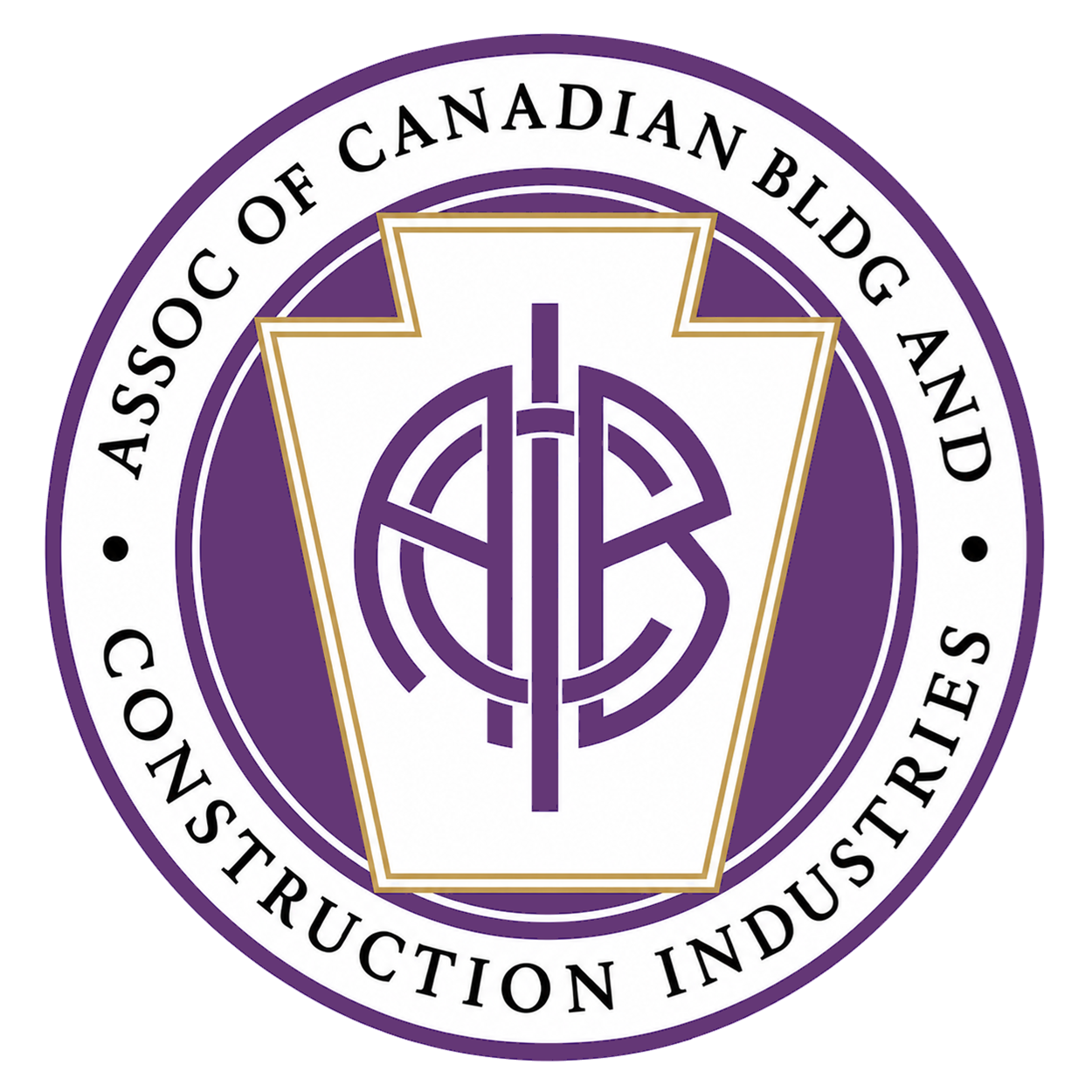
The association's badge prior to the 1928 name change

1. To promote better relations between the members on the one hand, and owners, architects, and engineers on the other.
2. To establish and maintain standard methods of practice between members within the industry.
3. To acquire, preserve, and disseminate valuable information concerning the industry.
4. To extent construction and improve conditions in the combined industry, to coördinate the units of the industry in its producing, manufacturing, distributing, professional and constructive activities, thereby increasing its usefulness.

All to the end that the industry shall be stabilized.

In its early years, regionalism proved a significant problem for the association. As a national organisation, the association purported to represent the interests of contracting interests across the whole country. However, the association was dominated by Central Canadian interests and its conferences were almost always held in Central Canada. Furthermore, most issues in the industry were of a regional nature, so there was little incentive for contractors from further afield to travel great distances to participate in irrelevant discussions. The association's first western president was Cecil Herbert Gunn of Winnipeg, who was elected to the office in 1940. To broaden regional participation, he organised two regional conferences in Winnipeg and Digby, respectively. The Winnipeg conference had only 18 in attendance, while the Digby conference was cancelled due to low registration.

The development of standard practices was an early priority of the association. The Standard Practices Committee worked in conjunction with the Engineering Institute of Canada and the Royal Architectural Institute of Canada to create a uniform standard contract.

At the Association's conference in February 1928, it decided to rename itself the Canadian Construction Association. The name change came into effect on 10 February 1928. Also in 1928, the association changed Reilly's title from executive secretary to general manager. The association also contemplated a move of its headquarters from Ottawa to Toronto. However, the move did not come to pass.

During the Great Depression, one of the association's primary concerns was unemployment and wage rates. The association negotiated with unions to set wages at a fixed rate of around 20 per cent of the total cost of a project. At the outbreak of war in 1939, the association endorsed a plan of the National Construction Council that placed the industry at the service of the federal government.

In 1943, Joseph Pigott, a Hamilton contractor who served as the CCA's third president, wrote a history of the organisation on its 25th anniversary. Pigott's book mostly consisted of sketches of the association's past presidents and of anecdotes from annual conventions. Of J. P. Anglin, Pigott wrote that "he was an idealist. That is uncommon in a successful business man. There will be some who disagree, but it has been my observation that the idealist, the dreamer, is happier in the Arts – and certainly more successful than in the field of competitive business." And of general manager J. C. Reilly, he wrote that "when I think of Clark Reilly I think of the words of one of the Gospels we will hear, as spring approaches, which speaks of Charity. 'Charity' it says 'is kind, patient, envieth no man, is not puffed up.' No words could better describe him. Kind and patient indeed he can look on the result of his work with quiet pride. This 25th anniversary is as much a Clark Reilly Anniversary as it is one of the Canadian Construction Association."

At the end of the war, the membership committee recommended 100 per cent increases to fees, which would see large firms pay $200 per year, medium firms $100, and small firms $50. In 1948, Reilly had four staff working for him at the head office.

At the CCA's annual meeting on 16 January 1947, J. Clark Reilly retired as general manager and was succeeded by Richard Golding Johnson (1913–2005), who had been associate general manager. In November 1950, Johnson was loaned to the federal government to become president of Defence Construction Limited. Sturley Donald Charles Chutter (1924–2026) became acting general manager; he assumed the office in April 1955. Chutter remained general manager until 1973, when the office was changed to a presidency.

The 32nd annual conference, held in Montreal in January 1950, featured an address by prime minister Louis St. Laurent.

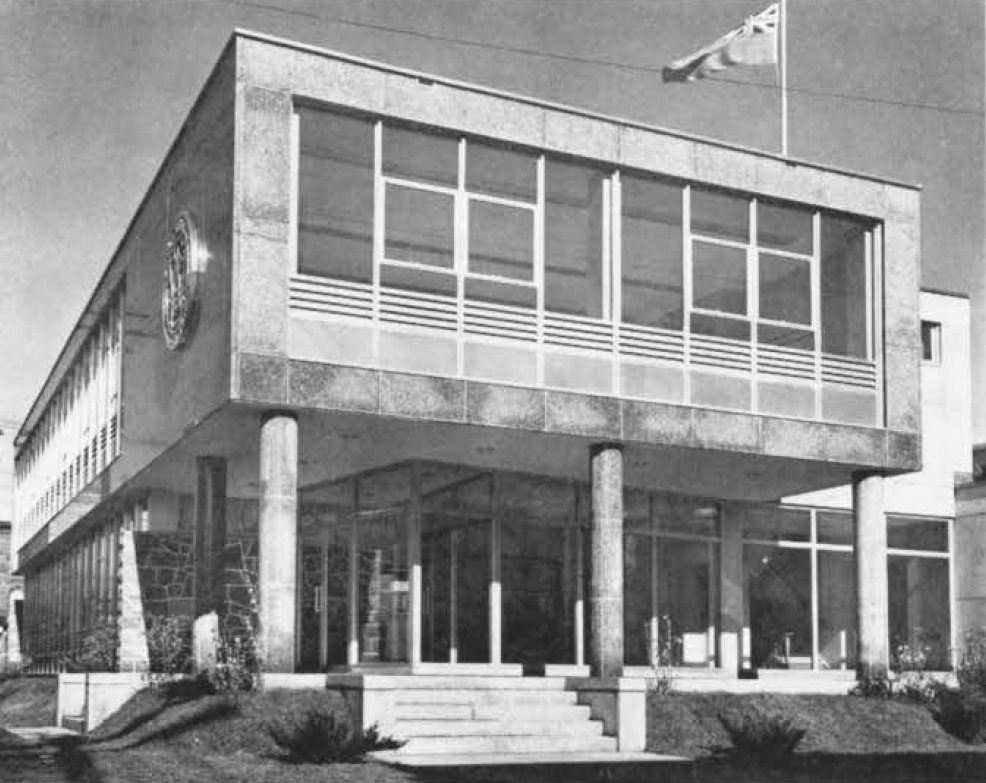
Construction House, the CCA's headquarters in Ottawa, photographed by Malak Karsh. The building opened on 18 October 1955 and was demolished in 1975.

At the 1951 convention, the building committee submitted a report that recommended the construction of a headquarters building that would provide around 5,000 square feet of space and cost in the vicinity of $150,000. In May 1954, the CCA announced that it would build a new headquarters at O'Connor and Gloucester. On Monday, 18 October 1955, the association opened its new headquarters, named Construction House, at 151 O'Connor Street. The building was designed by architects Abra & Balharrie, with associate firms Burgess & McLean and Hazelgrove & Lithwick. The building was constructed by Ross-Meagher Limited. Opening ceremonies were attended by Ottawa mayor Charlotte Whitton and member of parliament C. D. Howe.

The 1950s saw unprecedented growth in the association. In 1957, the CCA established a group insurance plan, and in 1958 it hired an industrial relations specialist. That same year, it created a new group of officers called assistant provincial vice-presidents to increase regional representation. By 1959, association revenues were $170,000.

In 1965, Harold Ball of Kitchener chaired an ad hoc committee on the future of the CCA that submitted a report with 19 recommendations for reorganisation. The report was accepted and marked a major turning point in this history of the CCA. Among the recommendations were the established of a 24-man board of directors, the abolishment of the management committee, the creation of a new members' bulletin, and an annual summer meeting.

The CCA celebrated its 50th birthday in 1968, and the annual conference was held in Ottawa at the Château Laurier from 26 January to 4 February. At the conference, prime minister Lester B. Pearson was inducted as an honorary member of the CCA.

In 1970, the association had a budget surplus of $58,000 and Construction House was free of debt. Major issues at the beginning of the decade were labour relations, high taxation, improved financing of construction associations, more training, and improved safety practices. In January 1973, the office of president was changed to the office of chairman of the board. Simultaneously, the CCA hired a new full-time, paid chief executive who would take the title of president. The first president was Jean-Henri "Henry" de Puyjalon (1928–1979). Puyjalon was the grandson of French explorer Henry de Puyjalon. The 1975 summer convention, held in Saint Andrews, New Brunswick, was notable as Brian Mulroney, then a lawyer, was in attendance. That same year, the CCA sold Construction House, which was demolished subsequently, and moved into rented premises. Following the implementation of price controls through the 1975 Anti-Inflation Act, the CCA served in a consultative role to the government in the application of the policy.

In October 1979, de Puyjalon agreed to step down for health reasons. His successor, who would assume the office in January 1980, was Robert Edgar Nuth (1927–2020). On 6 December 1979 died from cancer.

In the early 1980s, megaprojects were being undertaken each with its own collective agreement. This in turn made multi-employer bargaining at the provincial level difficult. As a result of this phenomenon, the association produced a book, written by Paul Weiler and Gérard Hébert entitled Mega Projects: The Collective Bargaining Dimension to address the problems and recommend solutions. At the same time, the Alberta economy fell into recession in part due to the National Energy Program, and many construction works moved east.

Nuth remained president for a decade. In 1990, he was succeeded by John Clayton Halliwell (1932–2023). Halliwell retired in March 1993. His successor was Michael Arthur Charles Atkinson, who had been with the CAA since 1981. Atkinson was president for 24 years. On 16 October 2017, he was succeeded by Mary Van Buren. After six years in office, on 1 May 2024, Rodrigue Gilbert succeeded her to become the CCA's sixth president.

== Leadership ==
=== President (to 1973) and Chairman of the Board (from 1973) ===
- 1918–21 – James Penrose Anglin
- 1922 – John Ballantyne Carswell OBE
- 1923–24 – Joseph Michael Pigott CBE
- 1925 – John Vickers Gray
- 1926–27 – Charles Blake Jackson
- 1928–29 – Samuel Edgar Dinsmore
- 1930–31 – Herbert Percival Frid
- 1932–33 – Charles James Allan Cook
- 1934–35 – William Henry Yates
- 1936–37 – Frederick George Rutley
- 1938–39 – Conrad Dawson Harrington
- 1940 – Cecil Herbert Gunn
- 1941 – John E. Clarke
- 1942–43 – John Bertram Stirling CD
- 1944–45 – Herbert Clifton Nicholls
- 1946–47 – Albert Deschamps OBE
- 1948–49 – Allan Crawford Ross
- 1950–51 – Robert Drummond
- 1952 – Percy Gilbert Wilmut
- 1953 – John Nash Flood
- 1954 – Raymond Brunet OBE
- 1955 – Wilbert Guy Malcom
- 1956 – Allan Turner Bone
- 1957 – Tullis Ninion Carter
- 1958 – Harold John Ball
- 1959 – John Eric Harrington
- 1960 – Jack Marshall Soules
- 1961 – Arthur Gerald Sullivan
- 1962 – Hugh Richardson Montgomery
- 1963 – Thomas Aimer Somerville
- 1964 – Donald Howard Jupp OBE
- 1965 – Neville Rudyard Williams
- 1966 – Armand Trottier
- 1967 – Peter Dudley Dalton
- 1968 – Alexander William Purdy
- 1969 – Mark Stein
- 1970 – Robert Gerald Saunders
- 1971 – Robert Chesley Tait Stewart
- 1972 – Eric Llewellyn Hartley MBE ED

Title changes to Chairman of the Board

- 1973 – Réal L’Heureux
- 1974 – Robert Albert Bird
- 1975 – David R. Penner
- 1976 – Donald Alfred Bain
- 1977 – Frederick Harry Barratt Charlesworth
- 1978 – Russel Currie Scrim
- 1979 – Ian Campbell MacInnes
- 1980 – Lorenzo Caletti
- 1981 – Neil Stuart Wither
- 1982 – Robert M. Gosse
- 1983 – Donald Proctor Giffin
- 1984 – Robert Burke Schuett
- 1985 – Henri J. VanderNoot
- 1986 – Alvin I. Reed
- 1987 – Gerald Désourdy
- 1988 – Peter Lysak
- 1989 – Jack Flemming
- 1990 – Robert G. Hunter
- 1991 – Jakob T. Thygesen
- 1992 – John Henry Ceriko
- 1993 – John Morton
- 1994 – Donald Whitmore
- 1995 – John Spratt
- 1996 – Brian Arthur Scroggs
- 1997 – Terry Billings
- 1998 – Willard Kirkpatrick
- 1999 – Michael A. Butt
- 2000 – Paul McLellan
- 2001 – John Gardner
- 2002 – Barry Brown
- 2003 – Thomas Brown
- 2004 – Shirley Westeinde
- 2005 – Murray Farmer
- 2006 – Alfonso Argento
- 2007 – Raymond Brunet
- 2008 – Paul A. Charette
- 2009 – Brad Greene
- 2010 – Wayne Morsky
- 2011 – Nadine J. Miller
- 2012 – John Schubert
- 2013 – Frank Rizzardo
- 2014 – Serge Massicotte
- 2015 – Anibal Valente
- 2016 – Gilbert Brulotte
- 2017 – Chris McNally
- 2018 – Zey Emir
- 2019 – John Bockstael
- 2020 – Joe Wrobel
- 2021 – Ray Bassett
- 2022–23 – Brendan Nobes
- 2024–25 – Francis Roy
- 2026 – Trevor Doucette

=== General Manager (to 1973) and President (from 1973) ===
- Arthur Simmons Clarson, 1919
- John Clark Reilly, 1919–1947
- Richard Golding Johnson, 1947–1955
- Sturley Donald Charles Chutter, 1955–1973

Title changes to President

- Jean-Henri de Puyjalon, 1973–1979
- Robert Edgar Nuth, 1980–1990
- John Clayton Halliwell, 1990–1993
- Michael Arthur Charles Atkinson, 1993–2017
- Mary Van Buren, 2017–2024
- Rodrigue Gilbert, 2024–present

== Published histories ==
- Halliwell, John. Proud Heritage, Exciting Future: 75th Anniversary of the Canadian Construction Association. Naylor Communications, 1993.
- Lawrie, Neil John. The Canadian Construction Association: An Interest-Group Organization and Its Environment. PhD thesis, University of Toronto, 1976.
- Pigott, Joseph. Do You Remember: 25 Years with the Canadian Construction Association, An Informal Commentary on Men and Events. 1943.
