= Donald Guloien =

Canadian business executive

Donald Arthur Guloien
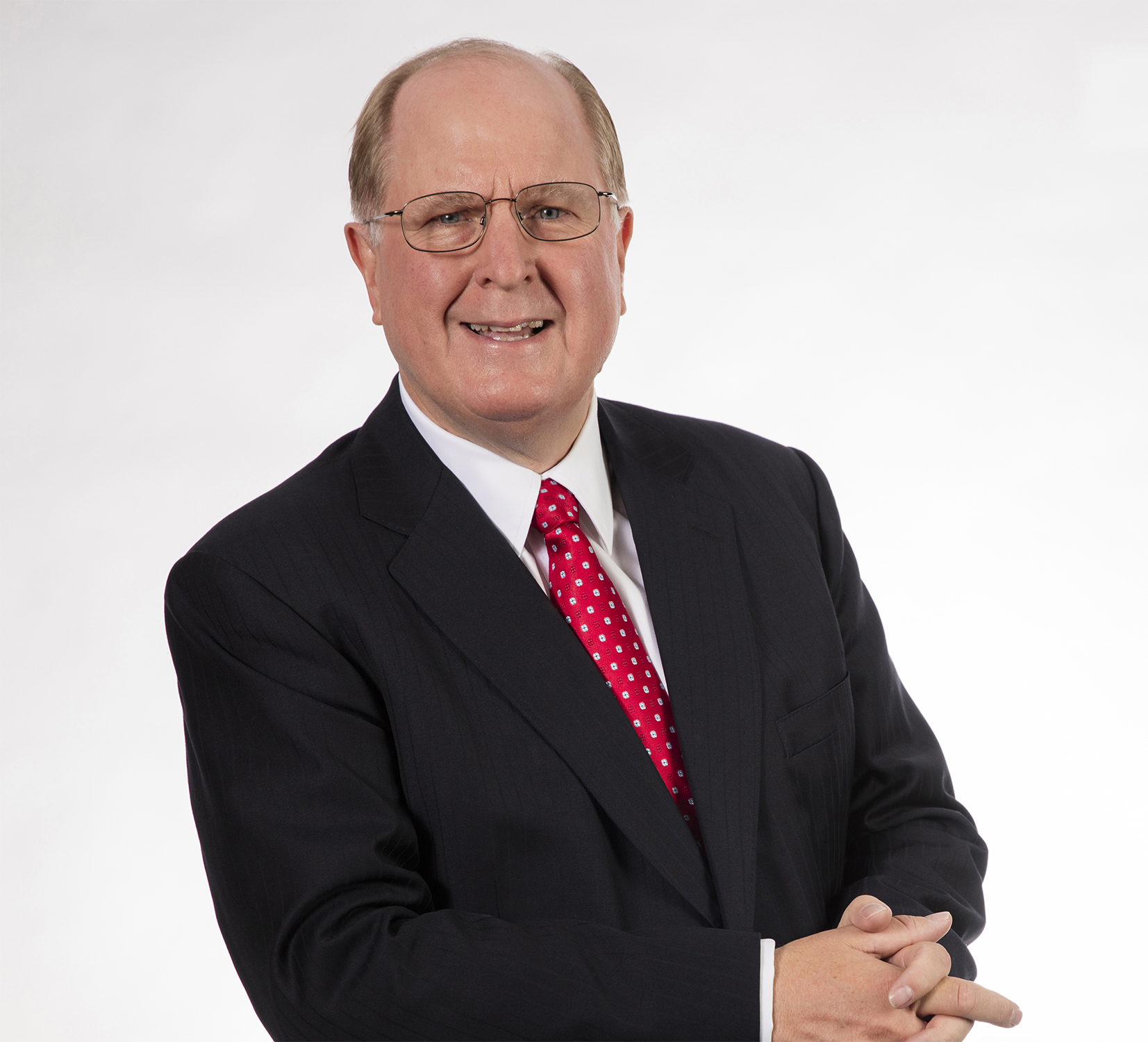
- Born: 27 April 1957 (age 69); Parry Sound, Ontario
- Education: University of Toronto (BCom 1980)
- Spouse: Irene Ann Boychuk

Donald Arthur Guloien (born 27 April 1957) is a Canadian business executive. He was the President and CEO of the financial services company, Manulife, the largest insurance company in Canada.

== Biography ==
=== Early life and education ===
Guloien was born in Parry Sound, Ontario, and lived in Sarnia, Ontario before he settled in Toronto. His father was a professional engineer.

He graduated from Silverthorn Collegiate Institute and earned a Bachelor of Commerce degree from the University of Toronto in 1980.

=== Career ===
Guloien joined Manulife in 1981 as a research analyst and progressed through several leadership positions in both the Canadian and U.S. divisions. In 1990, he became Vice President of the U.S. Individual Business, where he was responsible for the operations of Manulife's individual insurance and annuity business in the United States.

From 1994 to 2001, he led Manulife's business development unit, spearheading a number of key acquisitions, divestitures and strategic initiatives, including the merger of Manulife with The North American Life Assurance Company; the sale of Manulife's U.K. business; Manulife's conversion from a mutual life insurance company to a publicly traded stock company, its initial public offering, which was the largest in Canadian history at the time; and Manulife's entry into Japan.

From 2001 to 2009, Guloien served as Chief Investment Officer, where he was responsible for Manulife's worldwide investment operations. He spearheaded the growth of Manulife Asset Management into becoming a global leader in wealth management services, including retail mutual funds, pension funds, and endowments, and oversaw the integration in 2004 of John Hancock Financial's investment operations.

In June 2007, his portfolio was expanded to add responsibility for the company's Asian insurance operations in Japan, China, Hong Kong, Indonesia, the Philippines, Singapore, Taiwan, Vietnam, Malaysia, Thailand and Macau, businesses which account for roughly one-third of Manulife's global footprint.

On May 7, 2009, he was appointed president and CEO of Manulife.

In May 2017, it was announced that Guloien would retire as CEO of Manulife, with Roy Gori named as his successor as of October 1, 2017.

In 2018, together with his wife Irene Boychuk, Donald Guloien launched Guloien Capital, a venture capital firm that invests in early-stage companies.

=== Personal life ===
Guloien is married and has two children.
