= William R. C. Blundell =

Canadian businessman (1927–2023)

William Richard Charles Blundell OC
- Born: 13 April 1927; Montreal, Quebec
- Died: 10 March 2023 (aged 95); Toronto, Ontario
- Education: University of Toronto (1949)
- Spouse: Monique Audet (m. 1959)

William Richard Charles Blundell (13 April 1927 – 10 March 2023) was a Canadian engineer and businessman. Blundell served as a senior official with Canadian General Electric, Manulife, and Alcan.

Born in Montreal, Quebec, Blundell received a B.A.Sc. in 1949 from the University of Toronto. He joined Canadian General Electric in 1949 eventually becoming chairman and chief executive officer from 1985 to 1990. He retired from GE Canada in 1991.

Blundell was appointed to the board of directors of Manulife Financial in 1991. He was the interim President and chief executive officer from 1993 to 1994. From 1994 to 1998, he was chairman of the board. In 2001, he was appointed interim President and CEO of Alcan Aluminium Limited.

In 1997, Blundell was made an Officer of the Order of Canada.

On 20 March 1959, Blundell married Monique Audet. They had one son and three daughters. Blundell died on 10 March 2023 at the age of 95.
