= North American Life =

Canadian insurance company (1879–1995)

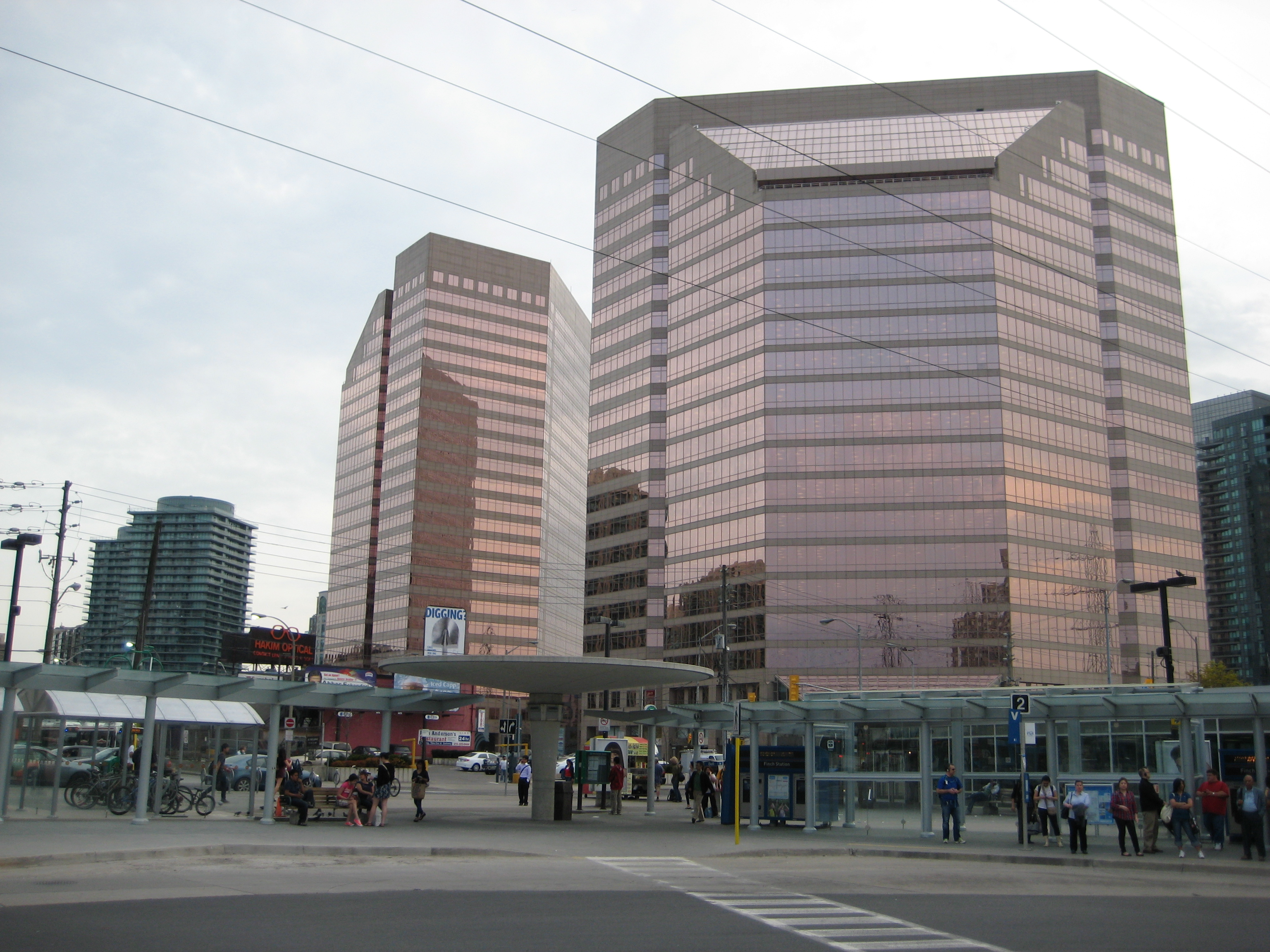
- North American Life Centre in Toronto
- Type: Mutual
- Industry: Insurance
- Founded: 15 May 1879
- Defunct: 31 December 1995
- Fate: Merged into Manulife
- Headquarters: Toronto, Ontario

The North American Life Assurance Company, commonly known as North American Life, was an insurance company headquartered in Newtonbrook, Toronto, Ontario.

In 1995, it was one of the largest mutual insurance companies in North America with US$4.48 billion in assets before merging with The Manufacturers Life Insurance Company to form Manulife Financial the following year.

== History ==
=== Nineteenth century ===
Following the defeat of the Liberal government in the federal election of 1878, the outgoing prime minister Alexander Mackenzie moved from Ottawa to Toronto. The following year, Mackenzie's friends endeavored to find him employment and decided to sponsor the incorporation of an insurance company. The company was formed on 15 May 1879, when the "Act to incorporate the 'North American Mutual Life Assurance Company' " received royal assent. Mackenzie served as its first president and George William Allan, a Conservative, as vice-president. Apart from Allan, virtually all of the company's founding members were Liberal luminaries, among them Donald Alexander Macdonald, Edward Blake, George Brown, Richard John Cartwright, and OIiver Mowat. From its inception, the company was national in scope, having agents in all provinces by 1882. Mackenzie served as president until 1892, though for the last few years he was inactive. He was succeeded by John L. Blaikie.

Early management of the company was decentralized and vested in five standing committees with a board of twenty-five members. In the first three months following its founding, the company issued 1,131 policies worth a total of $416,634, and by 1900 had 17,402 policies in force for a total value of $25,575,142.

=== Twentieth century ===
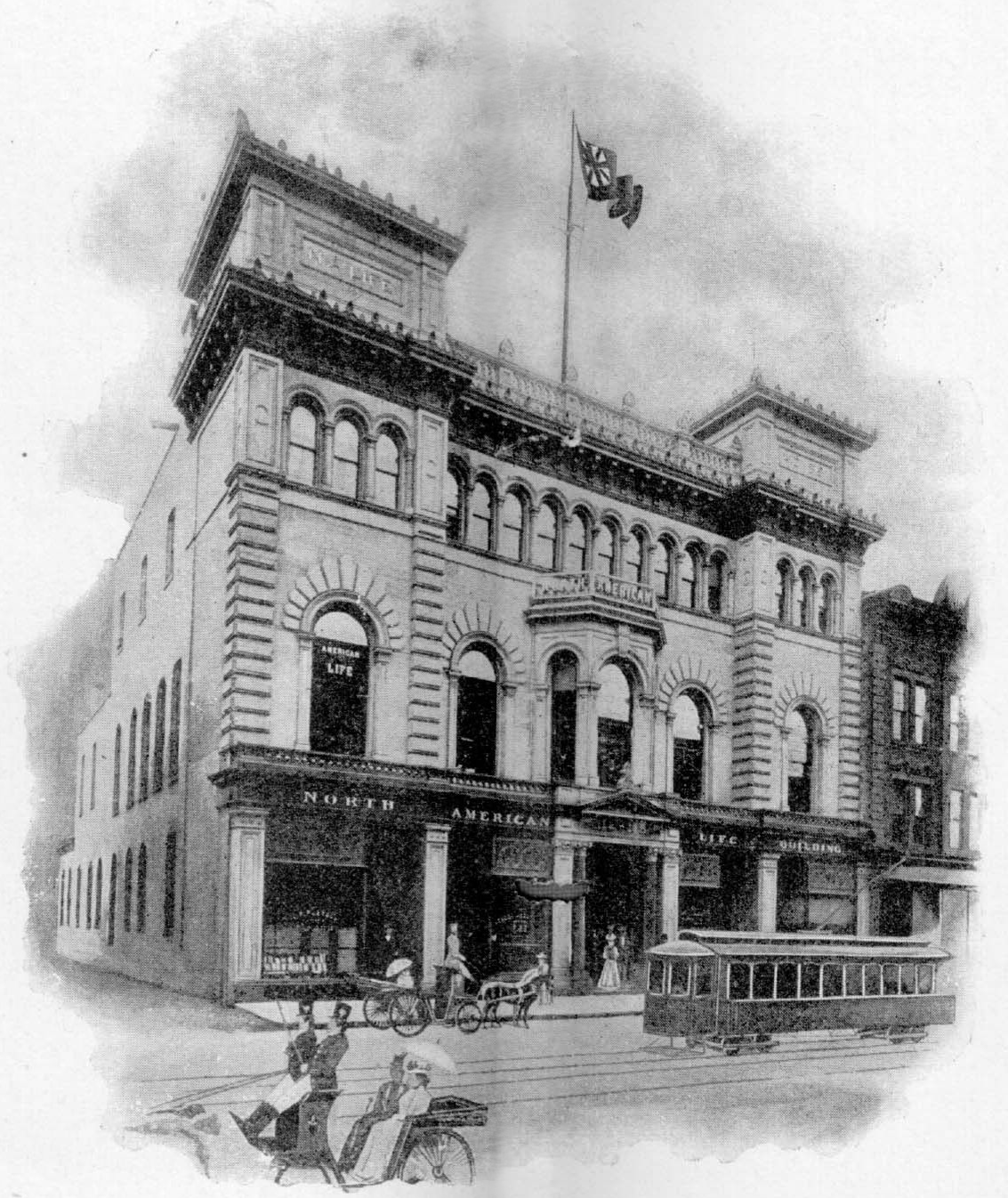
From 1898 to 1932, the company occupied the former United Empire Club Building, designed by Grant & Dick in 1874. It was remodeled by Langley & Langley.

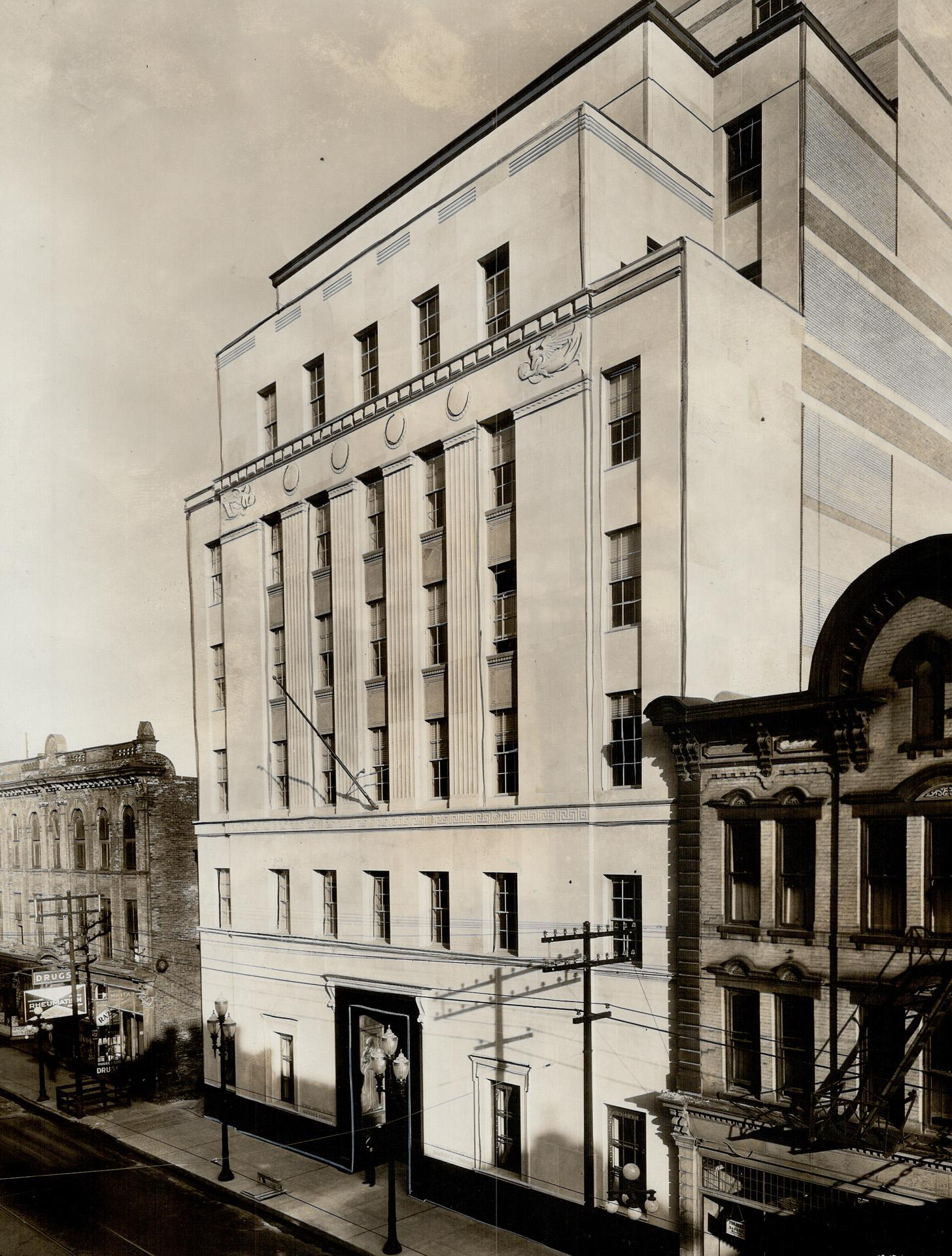
North American Life headquarters at 112 King Street West in Toronto, 1932 (demolished in 1976)

During World War I, the company's assets rose by 25%, with $2,000,000 of these assets being invested in victory bonds. The Great Depression saw a substantial increase in lapsed policies and a sharp decrease in returns on the company's investments.

In 1931, the semicentennial anniversary of the company's founding, a motion in support of mutualization was passed during a special general meeting. These efforts were met with hostility by those who accused the company of embezzlement under the guise of mutualization, with an investigation by the Banking and Commerce Committee of the House being called for in Parliament by Michael Luchkovich. A defence of the company in Parliament was launched by prime minister R. B. Bennett, who stated that North American Life "belongs to the policy-holders" who had unanimously enacted to mutuallize; no investigation was subsequently launched.

The board and management of the mutualized company included Thomas Bradshaw as president and D. E. Kilgour as general manager, with George Stewart Henry and Louis-Alexandre Taschereau among its directors. Since its founding in 1881, the company had occupied the old United Empire Club building at 112 King Street West in Toronto. In 1932, the company opened its new headquarters at the same address, which was designed in the Art Deco style by Marani, Lawson & Morris. This building was demolished in 1976, with some of its decorative features being moved to the grounds of the Guild Inn. By 1935, sales of life insurance had returned to normal.

==== Post-war era ====
During World War II, the company saw its total business in force increase at a rate of 9% per annum, from $239,456,765 in 1939 to $362,085,616 in 1945. In the immediate post-war period, the company grew substantially, passing the $1 billion in force mark in 1954 with a yearly business increase of between 12% and 14%. This was owed to the company shifting its investments into mortgages and an increase in its number of group insurance policies. In 1984, the North American Life Centre was opened at 5650 and 5700 Yonge Street in Toronto, which features a sculpture of the company's logo by Burton Kramer. The new building was shared with Xerox, and was constructed on the site where prime minister Lester B. Pearson was born; a commemorative plaque can be found on the facade. By 1987, total assets numbered $3.7 billion.

==== Amalgamation ====
In 1992, North American Life posted a 25% fall in profits as a result of higher health insurance claims and lower investment income from its real estate and equity portfolios. In 1996, the company amalgamated with The Manufacturers Life Insurance Company to form Manulife Financial. With this amalgamation, Manulife Financial acquired ownership of Elliot & Page Limited, a mutual funds company, and entered into the mutual fund business, renaming the new subsidiary Manulife Financial Asset Management Limited. The new company became the largest group life and health carrier in Canada, representing 13% of the market at the time of the amalgamation.

== Leadership ==
=== President ===
1. Alexander Mackenzie, 1881–1892
2. John Lang Blaikie, 1892–1912
3. Edward Gurney, 1912–1916
4. Leopold Goldman, 1916–1927
5. William Benjamin Taylor, 1926–1928
6. Thomas Bradshaw, 1928–1939
7. David Errett Kilgour, 1939–1946
8. Norman Stuart Robertson, 1946–1955
9. William Matheson Anderson, 1955–1963
10. John Tennant Bryden, 1963–1966
11. George Ryrie, 1966–1972
12. David Walter Page Pretty, 1972–1980
13. Andrew Gilmour McCaughey, 1980–1987
14. William Elwood Bradford, 1987–1993
15. John Gerard Lynch, 1993–1995

=== Chairman of the Board ===
1. James Henry Gundy, 1928–19??
2. Thomas Bradshaw, 19??–1939
3. Frank Augustus Rolph, 1939–1941
4. Norman Stuart Robertson, 1955–1963
5. William Matheson Anderson, 1963–1969
6. John Howard Taylor, 1969–1986
7. Gordon Peter Osler, 1986–1995
8. Robert Willem Korthals, 1995

== See also ==
- List of Canadian insurance companies
