= Chartered Institute of Credit Management =

British professional organization

- Abbreviation: CICM
- Formation: 1939; 87 years ago
- Type: Chartered company
- VAT ID no.: GB 245 9621 85
- Registration no.: 1162712; RC000877
- Products: Credit Management (magazine); UK Credit Management Index; Guides
- Website: www.cicm.com
- Formerly called: Institute of Credit Management

The Chartered Institute of Credit Management (formerly the Institute of Credit Management, often abbreviated as CICM) is a United Kingdom-based professional body representing credit professionals formed in 1939. The company is based in Peterborough and is the largest professional credit management organisation in Europe. The company is also a founding member of the Federation of European Credit Management Associations (FECMA).

After receiving a royal charter on 1 January 2015, the organization changed its name from Institute of Credit Management (ICM) to Chartered Institute of Credit Management (CICM).

== Purpose ==
The company is a company limited by guarantee and its goal is to raise the professional standards operating in credit management, to increase awareness of its importance as a management tool to members of the public, and to establish a hardship fund for the benefit of members or former members who are in conditions of need, hardship or distress.

Members of the company are tested and assessed by the CICM and generally hold appointments in the fields of industry and commerce as well as in certain activities such as debt collecting, credit reporting, credit insurance and insolvency practice.

The company also instructed to organise specialist education and training relevant to the needs of its members, provide an appropriate range of services to allow credit managers to keep up to date, and to consult with and make recommendations to the Government, European Commission, other professional bodies and trade associations.

== Products ==
The Chartered Institute of Credit Management provides a range of services to support credit professionals including its Credit Management magazine, learning and development services, including Ofqual-accredited qualifications, email briefings, helplines, and a range of resources relevant to credit management.

The CICM UK Credit Management Index is produced quarterly reflecting CICM's members' responses to questions about the same factors, and using the same methodology, as the US Credit Managers' Index. The CICM issues a press release each quarter reporting the results of the Index which receives media coverage.

In 2008, the Institute wrote a series of ten Managing Cashflow Guides for the former Department for Business, Innovation and Skills (BIS) providing advice on cashflow and credit management. It has also hosted and administered the Prompt Payment Code for BIS since it was launched at the start of 2009.
