= David A. Galloway =

Canadian businessman

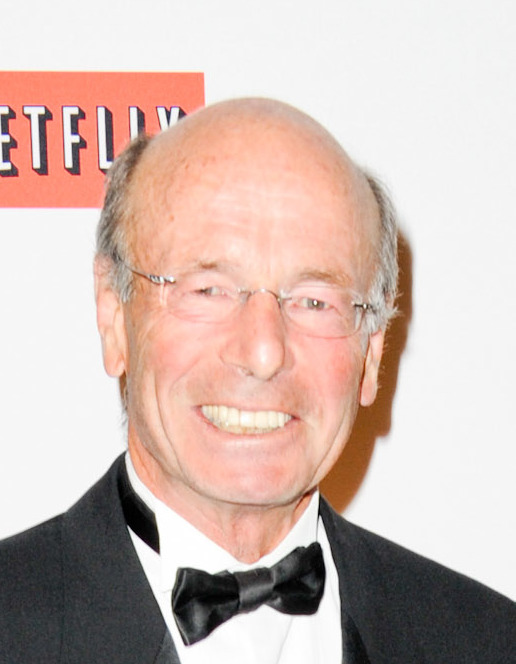
- Born: 1 November 1943 (age 82); Toronto, Ontario
- Education: University of Toronto (BA 1966); Harvard University (MBA 1968)
- Spouse: Judy K. Clarkson (m. 1966)

David Alexander Galloway (born 1 November 1943) is a Canadian businessman. He was the CEO of Torstar and chairman of the board of the Bank of Montreal from 2004 to 2012.

As well, Galloway served on the audit, human resources, governance and risk review committees of the Board of Directors of the Bank of Montreal.

He has also served on the Board of a number of public companies, including Abitibi, Cognos, Shell Canada, Hudson's Bay Company, Westbourne Inc. and Clearnet Communications.

Born in Toronto, Ontario, he attended the University of Toronto Schools before receiving a Bachelor of Arts in 1966 from the University of Toronto. He received an M.B.A. from Harvard University in 1968.

From 1983 to 1988, he was the president and C.E.O. of Harlequin Enterprises Ltd. He was president and chief executive officer of Torstar Corporation from 1988 to 2002. He was succeeded by John Honderich as publisher of Torstar.

Prior to joining the Harlequin/Torstar group of companies, for ten years, he was a founding partner of the Canada Consulting Group – a leading strategic management consulting firm, which was acquired by the Boston Consulting Group in 1992.

He is on the board of directors of Scripps Networks Interactive.

Business positions
Preceded by	Bank of Montreal Chairman	Succeeded by incumbent
Business positions
Preceded by	Torstar Corporation CEO; 1988 to 2002	Succeeded by
