= National Association of Credit Management =

The National Association of Credit Management (NACM) is a United States non-profit organization based in Columbia, Maryland that promotes standards for the business-to-business credit profession. As of 2022, NACM had more than 15,000 members, primarily of credit and financial executives representing manufacturers, wholesalers, financial institutions, and service organizations. The trade association specializes in education for its membership, advancement of credit industry practices as well as business credit and accounts receivable management products and services.

NACM’s education, training and professional certification programs include the Credit Business Associate (CBA), Credit Business Fellow (CBF), the Certified Credit and Risk Analyst (CCRA) and Certified Credit Executive (CCE) designations, among others.

NACM’s annual conference, Credit Congress, is the industry's largest gathering of credit professionals. Robin Schauseil is the group's president. The current national chairman is DeAnna Leahy, CCE.

NACM produces the monthly Credit Managers' Index, an economic indicator compiled through a poll of credit and financial professionals.

== History ==
NACM was founded in 1896 and has been active in its advocacy agenda for more than 100 years in Washington, DC, lobbying during the crafting of relevant legislation. Among its federal legislative priority issues in 2015 were bankruptcy reform, the Federal Trade Commission’s “Red Flags Rules” and the 3% withholding tax issues.

The association’s international arm is Finance, Credit & International Business (FCIB). FCIB provides education, seminars, credit groups and reporting designed for the international credit professional. In 2011, the division launched its “Doing Business in…” series to highlight key details of credit and collections dealings, notably for emerging economies such as Brazil, China and South Korea.

In 2016 NACM created a new division, the "Mechanic’s Lien and Bond Services" division, which includes information and services pertaining to various commercial construction-related matters as well as state and federal laws governing lien and bond rights and processes.
