= List of insurance companies in Canada =

This is a list of Canadian insurance companies.

The biggest insurance providers in Canada are Manulife, Canada Life (subsidiary of Great-West Lifeco), Sun Life Financial, Desjardins, and IA Financial Group (aka Industrial Alliance). Smaller insurers include those operating as subsidiaries of banks, such as CIBC Insurance and TD Insurance.

== Current insurance carriers ==
Company	Established	Headquarters	Notes
Algoma Mutual Insurance Company	1899	Thessalon, Ontario	
Allstate Canada			Canadian subsidiary of Allstate
Amherst Island Mutual Insurance Company	1894	Stella, Ontario	
Assumption Life			
Assurant Canada			
Aviva Canada	1999	Markham, Ontario	Formed in 1999 as the CGU Insurance Company of Canada through the merger of the General Accident Assurance Company of Canada and the Commercial Union Insurance Company of Canada. Renamed the Aviva Insurance Company of Canada in 2003.
Axiom Mutual Insurance Company	2021	Zurich, Ontario	Created through the merger of Hay Mutual and Town and Country Mutual.
Ayr Farmers' Mutual Insurance Company	1893	Ayr, Ontario	
Bay of Quinte Mutual Insurance Co.	1874	Picton, Ontario	
Beneva	2020	Quebec City, Quebec	Created through merger of La Capitale and SSQ Insurance
Bertie and Clinton Mutual Insurance Company	1970	Welland, Ontario	Formed through the merger of Bertie and Willoughby Mutual and Clinton Mutual.
Blanshard Mutual Insurance Company	1876	St Marys, Ontario	
Brant Mutual Insurance Company	1861	Brantford, Ontario	
CAA Insurance Company	1974	Markham, Ontario	Founded in Toronto as the Ontario Motor Insurance Company
Canada Life	1847	Winnipeg, Manitoba	Founded in Toronto. Amalgamed in 2020 with Great-West Life and London Life under the ownership of Great-West Lifeco. Headquartered in Winnipeg at the former Great-West Life offices.
Canada Protection Plan	1992	Toronto, Ontario	Subsidiary of Foresters Financial
Canadian Association of Blue Cross Plans: Alberta Blue Cross; Canassurance Hospital Service Association; Ontario Blue Cross; Quebec Blue Cross; Manitoba Blue Cross; Medavie Blue Cross; Pacific Blue Cross; Saskatchewan Blue Cross			
Canadian Premier	1916	Toronto, Ontario	Operates under the brand name Securian Canada
Caradoc Townsend Mutual	2018	Waterford, Ontario	Formed through the merger of Caradoc Delaware Mutual and Townsend Mutual.
Cayuga Mutual Insurance Company	1875	Cayuga, Ontario	
Chubb Insurance Company Of Canada		Toronto, Ontario	Canadian subsidiary of Chubb Limited
Combined Insurance Canada			Canadian subsidiary of Combined Insurance
Commonwell Mutual Insurance Group	2014	Lindsay, Ontario	Formed through the merger of the Farmers’ Mutual Insurance Company (Lindsay), Glengarry Mutual, and Lanark Mutual.
The Co-operators Group	1945	Guelph, Ontario	Founded in Regina as the Co-operative Life Insurance Company.
Desjardins Insurance			
Dufferin Mutual Insurance Company	1895	Shelbourne, Ontario	
Economical Insurance	1871	Kitchener, Ontario	
Edge Mutual Insurance Company	1887	Drayton, Ontario	Changed name from the Peel Maryborough Insurance Company in 2015.
Empire Life	1923	Kingston, Ontario	
Equitable Life Insurance Company of Canada	1920	Waterloo, Ontario	
Erie Mutual Fire Insurance Company	1871	Dunnville, Ontario	
Fenchurch General Insurance Company	1981	Toronto, Ontario	
Federated Insurance Company of Canada	1920	Winnipeg, Manitoba	
Foresters Financial	1874	Toronto, Ontario	
Gore Mutual Insurance Company	1839	Galt, Ontario	
Great American Insurance Company			
Green Shield Canada	1957	Windsor, Ontario	
Grenville Mutual Insurance Company	1892	Kemptville, Ontario	
HD Mutual Insurance	2024	Sheffield, Ontario	Formed through the merger of Halwell Mutual and Dumfries Mutual.
Heartland Farm Mutual Inc.	2016	Waterloo, Ontario	Formed through the merger of North Waterloo Farmers Mutual and Oxford Mutual.
Howick Mutual Insurance Company	1873	Wroxeter, Ontario	
Humania			
IA Financial Group	1987	Quebec City, Quebec	Formed through the merger of Alliance Nationale and Industrial Life.
Intact Insurance	1809		Fire insurance company formed in Canada. Founded as the Nova Scotia Fire Insurance Association in 1809; incorporated as the Halifax Fire Insurance Company in 1819. Renamed the ING Insurance Company of Canada in 2002. Renamed the Intact Insurance Company in 2009.
Ivari	1932	Toronto, Ontario	
Kent and Essex Mutual Insurance Company	1888	Chatham, Ontario	
L&A Mutual Insurance Company	1877	Napanee, Ontario	Originally the Lennox and Addington Mutual Fire Insurance Company.
Lambton Mutual Insurance Company	1875	Watford, Ontario	
Maple Mutual Insurance Company	1910	Dresden, Ontario	
Manulife	1887	Toronto, Ontario	
Munich Re Canada			
North Blenheim Mutual Insurance Company	1861	Bright, Ontario	
Peel Mutual Insurance Company	1876	Brampton, Ontario	
Pembridge Insurance	1999	Concord, Ontario	Subsidiary of Allstate Canada
The Personal Insurance Company	1974	Lévis, Quebec	Subsidiary of Desjardins
Pilot Insurance Company	1927		Founded in Waterloo, Ontario as the Pilot Automobile and Accident Insurance Company. Acquired by the Standard Accident Insurance Company of Detroit in 1930. Now part of the Aviva group.
PolicyMe	2018	Toronto, Ontario	
Primerica Canada			Canadian subsidiary of Primerica
Quebec Assurance Company	1816	Toronto, Ontario	Second insurance company founded in Canada. Renamed the Quebec Assurance Company in 1963. Subsidiary of Intact Financial.
Reliable Life			
Salus Mutual Insurance Company	2023	North Aylmer, Ontario	Formed through the merger of Howard Mutual and West Elgin Mutual.
Serenia Life	1972	Waterloo, Ontario	Formed through the merger of the Aid Association for Lutherans and the Lutheran Brotherhood. Called the Lutheran Life Insurance Society of Canada originally. Renamed FaithLife Financial in 2005. Assumed current name in 2022.
South Easthope Mutual Insurance Company	1871	Tavistock, Ontario	
Sovereign General Insurance Company	1953	Toronto, Ontario	Subsidiary of the Co-operators
Sun Life Financial	1865	Toronto, Ontario	
Swiss Re			
Teachers Life	1939		
Tradition Mutual Insurance Company	2002	St Marys, Ontario	Formed through the merger of Blanshard Mutual and Downie Mutual.
Trillium Mutual Insurance Company	2004	Listowel, Ontario	Formed through the merger of Formosa Mutual and Elma Mutual.
Trisura Guarantee Insurance Company	2006	Toronto, Ontario	
UV Insurance	1889		Formerly the Union Life Mutual Assurance Company
Wawanesa Insurance	1896	Winnipeg, Manitoba	
West Wawanosh Mutual Insurance Company	1879	Goderich, Ontario	
Westminster Mutual Insurance Company	1857	Belmont, Ontario	
Yarmouth Mutual Insurance Company	1881	St Thomas, Ontario	
Zensurance	2016	Toronto, Ontario	

=== Bank-affiliated carriers ===
- BMO Life
- CIBC Insurance
- National Bank Insurance
- RBC Insurance
- Scotia Life
- TD Insurance

=== Government-owned insurance companies ===
- Insurance Corporation of British Columbia
- Manitoba Public Insurance
- Saskatchewan Government Insurance
  - Coachman Insurance Company
- Société de l'assurance automobile du Québec

== Defunct insurance companies ==
Company	Established	Dissolved	Fate
Anglo Canada Fire & General Insurance Company	1949	2006	Became AXA General Insurance.
Bertie and Willoughby Mutual	1880	1970	Merged with Clinton Mutual to form Bertie and Clinton Mutual
Blanshard Mutual Insurance Company	1876	2002	Merged with Downie Mutual to form Tradition Mutual
British America Assurance Company	1833	1976	Renamed the Royal Insurance Company of Canada in 1976 and the Royal & Sun Alliance Insurance Company of Canada (RSA) in 1996. Acquired by Intact in 2021.
Canada National Fire Insurance Company	1909	1932	Liquidated; files taken over by Sun Alliance.
Canadian Fire Insurance Company	1895	1962	Merged into the Canadian Indemnity Company
Canadian Indemnity Company	1916	1989	Merged into Dominion of Canada General Insurance.
Canadian Pioneer Insurance Company	1960	1978	Merged into General Accident Assurance.
Caradoc Delaware Mutual Insurance Company	1884	2018	Merged with Townsend Mutual to form Caradoc Townsend Mutual.
Casualty Company of Canada	1911	1989	Merged into Dominion of Canada General Insurance.
Central Fire Insurance Company of New Brunswick	1836	1901	Wound up in 1901.
Citizens’ Insurance Company of Canada	1861	1891	Acquired by Sun Life.
Clinton Mutual Fire Insurance Company	1898	1970	Merged with Bertie and Willoughby Mutual to form Bertie and Clinton Mutual
Commercial Union Assurance Company of Canada		1999	Merged with the General Accident Insurance Company of Canada to form the CGU Insurance Company of Canada (now Aviva Canada).
Confederation Life Assurance Company	1871	1995	Acquired by Manulife and Maritime Life after bankruptcy
Continental Life Insurance Company	1899	1965	Became Zurich Life Insurance Company of Canada.
Crown Life Assurance Company	1900	1998	Canada Life Assurance
Dominion Life Assurance Company	1889	1985	Manulife
Dominion of Canada General Insurance Company	1887	2013	The Travelers Companies
Downie Mutual Insurance Company	1884	2002	Merged with Blanshard Mutual to form Tradition Mutual
Dumfries Mutual Fire Insurance Company	1856	2024	Merged with Halwell Mutual to form HD Mutual.
Dunwich Farmers' Mutual Fire Insurance Company	1880	1979	Merged with Southwold Farmers Mutual Fire Insurance to form West Elgin Mutual.
East Williams Mutual Insurance Company	1875	2001	Merged with Ekfrid Mutual and Lobo Mutual to form Town and Country Mutual.
Eaton Life Insurance	1920	1986	Originally the T. Eaton Life Assurance Company. Acquired in 1986 by Laurentian Life as part of the purchase of Eaton Financial.
Ekfrid Mutual Insurance Company	1891	2001	Merged with Lobo Mutual and East Williams Mutual to form Town and Country Mutual.
Elma Mutual Insurance Company	1884	2004	Merged with Formosa Mutual to form Trillium Mutual.
Eramosa Mutual Fire Insurance Company	1861	1968	Merged with Halton Mutual and Puslinch Mutual to form Halwell Mutual.
Excelsior Life Insurance Company	1889	1999	Purchased in 1960 by Aetna; changed name to Aetna Life Insurance Company of Canada in 1989. Acquired by Maritime Life in 1999.
Family Life Assurance Company	1963		Merged into Sovereign Life.
Farmers' Mutual Insurance Company (Lindsay)	1895	2014	Merged with Glengarry Mutual and Lanark Mutual to form Commonwell Mutual.
Federal Life Assurance Company	1882	1915	Acquired by Sun Life.
Fidelity Life Assurance Company	1907	19??	Founded as the Saskatchewan Life Insurance Company. Changed name to Fidelity Life in 1942. Acquired by Friends Provident in 1957. Moved to Vancouver in 1959.
Formosa Mutual Insurance Company	1880	2004	Merged with Elma Mutual to form Trillium Mutual.
General Accident Insurance Company of Canada	1906	1999	Merged with the Commercial Union Insurance Company of Canada to form the CGU Insurance Company of Canada (now Aviva Canada).
Glengarry Mutual Insurance Company	1895	2014	Merged with Farmers’ Mutual Insurance Company (Lindsay) and Lanark Mutual Insurance Company to form Commonwell Mutual.
Great-West Life Assurance Company	1891	2020	Merged with Canada Life and London Life using the Canada Life name, under the ownership of Great-West Lifeco.
Grey & Bruce Mutual Insurance Company	1878	2014	Merged into Howick Mutual.
Guarantee Company of North America	1872	2019	Formed as the Canada Guarantee Company. Name changed in 1880. Acquired by Intact Financial.
Halton Mutual Fire Insurance Company	1890	1968	Merged with the Puslinch Mutual and Eramosa Mutual to form Halwall Mutual.
Halwell Mutual Insurance Company	1968	2024	Formed through the merger of the Puslinch Mutual, Eramosa Mutual, and the Halton Mutual. Merged with Dumfries Mutual to form HD Mutual.
Hartford Steam Boiler Inspection and Insurance Company			Munich Re
Hay Mutual Insurance Company	1875	2021	Merged with Town and Country Mutual to form Axiom Mutual.
Home District Mutual Fire Insurance Company	1837		
Howard Mutual Insurance Company	1892	2023	Merged with West Elgin Mutual to form Salus Mutual.
Imperial Life Assurance Company	1896	2001	Acquired by Desjardins in 1994, merged operations in 2001.
Kings Mutual Insurance Company	1904	2021	Acquired by Heartland Farm Mutual.
La Capitale			Merged with SSQ Insurance to form Beneva
Lanark Mutual Insurance Company	1896	2014	Merged with Farmers’ Mutual Insurance Company (Lindsay) and Glengarry Mutual Insurance Company to form the Commonwell Mutual.
Laurentian Life (La Laurentienne)	1938	1993	Became a mutual in 1958, demutualised in 1988, merged with Desjardins Life in 1993 to become Desjardins-Laurentian Life Assurance. Merged in 2001 with Imperial life to become Desjardins Financial Security.
Laurier Life Insurance Company	1966	1998	Merged into Imperial Life
Liberty Health		2003	Maritime Life
Life Insurance Company of Alberta	1948	1979	Acquired by Toronto Mutual Life Insurance.
Lobo Mutual Insurance Company	1882	2001	Merged with Ekfrid Mutual and East Williams Mutual to form Town and Country Mutual.
London-Canada Insurance Company	1859	1987	Formed as the Agricultural Mutual Fire Insurance Company. Changed name to London Mutual Fire Insurance Company of Canada in 1878. Changed name to London-Canada Insurance in 1925. Merged with the Great Eastern Insurance Company to form the Hartford Insurance Company of Canada.
London Life Insurance Company	1874	2020	Merged with Canada Life and Great-West Life using the Canada Life name, under the ownership of Great-West Lifeco.
Maritime Life Assurance Company	1922	2004	Manulife
Mercantile Fire Insurance	1875	1896	Acquired by London and Lancashire Insurance
Merchants Casualty Insurance Company	1913	1936	Founded in Winnipeg as the Merchants Casualty Company. Moved to Waterloo in 1923. Assets acquired by the Merchants Casualty Insurance Company in 1924. Acquired by Economical Insurance in 1936.
Merchants Fire Insurance Company	1898	1958	Acquired by London and Lancashire.
Monarch Life Assurance Company	1904	1983	Acquired by North American Life.
Montreal Fire Insurance Company	1818	1820	Third insurance company founded in Canada. Failed in 1820.
Montreal Life Insurance Company	1908	1986	Founded as the Travellers Life Assurance Company of Canada; name changed in 1924. Merged into Empire Life.
Mutual Life Assurance Company	1868	2002	Renamed Clarica Life in 2000. Acquired by Sun Life in 2002.
National Life Assurance Company of Canada	1897	2005	Merged into Industrial Alliance Insurance
North American Life Assurance Company	1881	1995	Manulife
North Waterloo Farmers Mutual	1874	2016	Merged with Oxford Mutual to form Heartland Farm Mutual
North West Life Assurance Company of Canada	1966	2000	Became the Industrial-Alliance Pacific Life Insurance Company.
Northern Life Assurance Company of Canada	1894	1986	Acquired by the Inland Financial Company. Individual operations integrated into Sovereign Life, group operations sold to Constellation Assurance.
Ontario Blue Cross		1995	Liberty Health
Oxford Mutual Insurance Company	1878	2016	Merged with North Waterloo Farmers Mutual to form Heartland Farm Mutual
Pacific Coast Fire Insurance Company	1890	1989	Acquired by Friends Provident-Century in 1920. Renamed Century Insurance Company of Canada in 1966. Wound up and operations acquired by Dominion Insurance.
Pictou County Farmers Mutual Fire Insurance Company	1904	2016	Merged into Kings Mutual
Puslinch Mutual Fire Insurance Company	1859	1968	Merged with Eramosa Mutual and Halton Mutual to form Halwell Mutual.
Queen City Fire Insurance Company	1871	1960	Liquidated?
Royal General Insurance Company of Canada	1906	1995	Founded as the Royal Plate Glass Insurance Company. Name changed to Royal General Insurance in 1950. Name changed to Continental Insurance Company of Canada in 1979. Discontinued in 1995.
Southwold Farmers Mutual Fire Insurance Company	1878	1979	Merged with Dunwich Mutual to form West Elgin Mutual.
SSQ Insurance			Merged with La Capitale to create Beneva
State Farm		2014	Desjardins Financial Security
Toronto Mutual Life Insurance Company	1934	2002	Founded as the Ancient Foresters’ Mutual Life Insurance Company. Changed name in 1939. Merged with Western Life to form Unity Life of Canada (now Foresters Life).
Town and Country Mutual Insurance Company	2001	2021	Formed through the merger of Lobo Mutual, Ekfrid Mutual and East Williams Mutual. Merged with Hay Mutual to form Axiom Mutual.
Townsend Mutual Insurance Company	1879	2018	Merged with Caradoc Delaware Mutual to form Caradoc Townsend Mutual.
United Investment Life Assurance Company			Merged into Sovereign Life.
UnumProvident		2004	RBC Insurance
Waterloo Mutual Insurance Company	1863	1980	Acquired by Economical Insurance
Wellington Insurance Company	1840	2002	Merged into the ING Insurance Company of Canada.
West Elgin Mutual Insurance Company	1880	2023	Formed through the merger of Dunwich Mutual and Southwold Farmers Mutual. Merged with Howard Mutual to form Salus Mutual.
Westbury Canadian Life		2004	RBC Insurance
Western Assurance Company	1851	2025	Merged into Intact Insurance.
Western Life Assurance Company		2002	Merged with Toronto Mutual Life to form Unity Life of Canada (now Foresters Life).
Western Union Insurance Company	1940	2003	Merged into the ING Insurance Company of Canada.
Westmount Life Insurance Company	1962		Merged into Sovereign Life.
Zurich Life Insurance of Canada		2001	Manulife and Square One

== See also ==
- List of banks and credit unions in Canada
- List of trust and loan companies in Canada
