= List of corporations based in Winnipeg =

This is a list of corporations based in Winnipeg.

This includes businesses completely owned and operated out of Winnipeg, as well as corporations that have significant operations (manufacturing, etc.) in Winnipeg, such as American-owned companies that base their Canadian division in Winnipeg (as in the case of Lifetouch Canada). Ordered here by broad categories, some corporations may fall into more than one section.

Also included in this list, at the bottom, are companies that were once based in Winnipeg but have since moved, as well as defunct companies that were based in Winnipeg when they were active.

== Agribusiness ==
- Cargill Ltd.
- G3 Canada
- Farmers Edge — digital agriculture service
- James Richardson & Sons — agribusiness conglomerate
  - Richardson International — agriculture and food industry company
- MacDon Industries Ltd.
- Monsanto Canada
- Paterson GlobalFoods — agrifoods company
- Ridley Inc. (Canadian office)
- Parrish & Heimbecker Ltd.
- Versatile — brand of agricultural equipment

== Business services and human resources ==
- Online Business Systems — Guiding business through the evolving digital landscape
- Studio Farout - digital marketing, design agency services and website and software development company
- Ceridian Canada (payroll) — human resources software and services
- Norima Consulting — technology consulting and strategic resourcing
- People Corporation — group benefits administration, HR consulting, and retirement services
- Sherpa.McKim — digital marketing service, formed by the 2021 amalgamation of Sherpa Marketing and McKim Communications Group

== Communications and entertainment ==
- Aboriginal Peoples Television Network
- Buffalo Gal Pictures — independent film and television production company
- Canwest Global Communications — defunct media conglomerate
- Eagle Vision — independent film and television production company
- Farpoint Films — film and television production company
- Frantic Films — film, television and commercial services
- Les Productions Rivard — independent film and television production company
- Manitoba Liquor & Lotteries Corporation (crown corporation)
- Merit Motion Pictures — independent documentary film and television production company
- True North Sports & Entertainment
- Ubisoft Winnipeg — video-games studio

=== Performance arts ===
- Manitoba Chamber Orchestra Inc.
- Manitoba Opera
- Manitoba Theatre for Young People
- Prairie Theatre Exchange Inc.
- Rainbow Stage — Canada's largest and longest-running outdoor theatre
- Royal Winnipeg Ballet — Canada's oldest ballet company
- Royal Manitoba Theatre Centre Inc.
- School of Contemporary Dancers Inc.
- Shakespeare in the Ruins
- Theatre Projects Manitoba
- Winnipeg Jewish Theatre
- Winnipeg Symphony Orchestra
- Winnipeg's Contemporary Dancers — Canada's longest continuously running modern dance company

== Finance and insurance ==
- Assiniboine Credit Union — credit union
- BCV Asset Management — investment and wealth management service
- Canada Life Assurance Company (Canada Life)
- Federated Insurance Company of Canada
- Great-West Lifeco
- Investors Group
- Manitoba Blue Cross — not-for-profit health benefits provider
- Manitoba Public Insurance Corp. (crown corporation)
- Red River Mutual Insurance
- Telpay — electronic payment company
- Value Partners Investments — develops and manages mutual funds for retail investors
- The Wawanesa Mutual Insurance Co.
- Wellington-Altus Private Wealth — wealth management service

== Food, drink, and hospitality ==
- Aura Hair Group — hair salons
- Canad Inns — hotel chain
- Chicken Delight — restaurant
- Fort Garry Brewing Company — brewery
- Half Pints Brewing Company — brewery
- Old Dutch Foods (Canadian operations) — snack food manufacturer
- Scott-Bathgate Ltd. — foodstuff manufacturer
- SkipTheDishes — on-demand food delivery service
- Temple Hotels — hotel chain
- VJ's Drive Inn — restaurant

Former companies:

- A&W — fast-food restaurant founded in Winnipeg; now headquartered in BC.
- Agassiz Brewing — former brewing company
- Dickie Dee — ice-cream brand
- Kraves Candy Co. — the original makers of Clodhoppers before selling their assets to Brookside Foods in BC.
- Salisbury House — restaurant

== Healthcare and pharmaceutical ==
- Apotex Fermentation — biotech
- Cangene Corp. — biotech
- Manitoba Blue Cross — not-for-profit health benefits provider

== Manufacturing ==
- Arctic Glacier — packaged-ice manufacturer
- Boeing Canada Technology — Canadian subsidiary of Boeing
- Bristol Aerospace — aerospace manufacturer
- Buhler Industries Inc.
- Crane Plumbing Corporation — defunct bathroom fixtures manufacturer, wholly owned by the American Crane Co.
- Fort Garry Brewing Company
- General Electric (manufacturing testing)
- Kitchen Craft of Canada Ltd. — cabinetwork manufacturer
- McClick Technology Inc.
- Mondetta Clothing Company — casual and sportswear design and manufacturing company
- Motor Coach Industries
- NFI Group — manufacturer of transit buses and motorcoaches
  - New Flyer Industries — bus manufacturer
- Label Source — custom label manufacturer
- Nas Digitech N.A — develops and distributes protective film and sticky mats
- Old Dutch Foods (Canadian operations) — snack food manufacturer
- Palliser Furniture Ltd. — furniture manufacturer
- Pollard Banknote
- Richlu Manufacturing — workwear manufacturer
  - Tough Duck
  - Work King Safety
- Scott-Bathgate Ltd. — foodstuff manufacturer
- Speedpro — largest sign and image producing company in Canada
- Tiber River Naturals — manufacturer and distributor of home, pet, and personal-care products
- Vesta Automation Inc.

== Publishing ==
- Arbeiter Ring Publishing — bookstore, specializing in progressive, radical and anarchist literature
- Arts Manitoba Publications Inc — publisher of Border Crossings magazine
- At Bay Press — tradebook publishing company
- Fernwood Publishing — second office (headquartered in Halifax)
- Great Plains Publications
- IMAQPRESS Inc. — publisher of books, periodicals and knowledge-hubs
- J. Gordon Shillingford Publishing
- McNally Robinson — book retailer
- Portage & Main Press / HighWater Press
- Turnstone Press Ltd. — literary publisher
- University of Manitoba Press

Former companies:

- Aqua Books — former independent bookstore
- Bedside Press
- Harlequin Enterprises — book publisher founded in Winnipeg; now headquartered in Toronto
- Mondragon Bookstore & Coffeehouse — former political bookstore and vegan cafe

== Retail and apparel ==
- Arctic Co-operatives Limited — cooperative federation
- Devicelist — wholesaler and retailer
- Domo — gasoline retailer
- K-Tel
- McNally Robinson — book retailer
- The North West Company — multinational grocery and retail company; owner of Northern Stores, NorthMart, Giant Tiger (in Western Canada), Alaska Commercial Co., and Cost-U-Less, none of which are based in Winnipeg.
- Princess Auto
- Red River Co-op — retail cooperative
- Stedmans V&S (V&S) — variety discount department store chain, now permanently closed.

Former companies:

- Hudson's Bay Company — retailing; moved headquarters from Winnipeg
- Metropolitan Stores — former department store
- Mondragon Bookstore & Coffeehouse — former political bookstore and vegan cafe
- SAAN — discount department store chain; moved headquarters from Winnipeg and is now defunct

=== Apparel and jewelry ===
- Ben Moss Jewellers
- Manitobah Mukluks — mukluk and moccasin manufacturer and distributor
- Mondetta Clothing Inc. — casual & sportswear design and manufacturing company
  - Modern Ambition — business and formalwear
  - Mondetta Originals — clothing line that renews Mondetta's original collections from the company's early days, particularly its "world flag" collection.
  - Mondetta Performance Gear (MPG) — activewear
- Nygård International — apparel manufacturer and retailer
- Richlu Manufacturing — workwear
  - Tough Duck
  - Work King Safety
- Silver Jeans Co. — designer denim company

== Technology ==
- Bold Commerce — e-commerce technology
- Ceridian Canada (payroll) — human resources software and services
- Canada Computing - IT Solutions & managed services provider, providing both fully and co-managed services.
- Exchange Technology Services
- FPOM — website for business listings, buy/sell classifieds, and local social-networking
- IC Group Inc
- IntouchCX
- On4 Networks Corp.
- IMAQ Technologies — Developing Emerging Technologies and Startups for Future Generations
- Revvo Inc. — business review automation platform
- SkipTheDishes — on-demand food delivery service
- Tactile Robotics
- Avenit IT Inc. — IT Solutions Managed Service Provider service
- Resolute Technology Solutions - IT Solutions Managed Service Provider

== Transportation ==
- Bison Transport
- CentrePort Canada — trimodal inland port
- Kivalliq Air — airline
- Perimeter Aviation — airline
- Reimer Express
- NFI Group — manufacturer of transit buses and motorcoaches
  - New Flyer Industries — bus manufacturer

== Other businesses/services ==
- Bison Fire Protection — sells, installs, and maintains fire protection equipment
- Boyd Autobody and Glass — automotive repair
- Heartland International English School — English-language training and testing institution for international students in Winnipeg and Mississauga
- IMAQ Research — A not-for-profit multidisciplinary and transdisciplinary research group
- J-CON Civil — civil construction service, particularly for sewer and water projects
- Lifetouch Canada — school photography service
- Manitoba Hydro (government-owned) — electric power and natural gas utility company
  - Centra Gas
- Mobile Tech Lab — technology repair store
- Roadtrips – luxury sports tour operator, part of Internova Travel Group
- Solar EPC Canada — renewable/solar energy
- Thompson Dorfman Sweatman LLP — legal firm
- TREK Geotechnical — engineering consulting service for geotechnical and water resources applications.

== Companies founded or formerly based in Winnipeg ==
- A&W — fast-food restaurant founded in Winnipeg; now headquartered in BC.
- Agassiz Brewing — former brewing company
- Agricore United — agribusiness
- Aqua Books — former independent bookstore
- Canwest — former media conglomerate
- Crane Plumbing Corporation — defunct bathroom fixtures manufacturer, wholly owned by the American Crane Co.
- Dickie Dee — ice-cream brand
- Harlequin Enterprises — book publisher, founded in Winnipeg; now headquartered in Toronto
- Hudbay — mining company
- Hudson's Bay Company — retailing
- Ipsos-Reid — research company founded in Winnipeg; now operating as Ipsos in Canada.
- Kraves Candy Co. — the original makers of Clodhoppers before selling their assets to Brookside Foods in BC.
- Liquid Image Corporation — company that manufactured head-mounted displays.
- Louis Dreyfus Group — agribusiness
- Manitoba Liquor Control Commission (crown corporation) — former liquor regulator of Manitoba
- Manitoba Lotteries Corp. (crown corporation) — former lotteries regulator of Manitoba
- Metropolitan Stores — former department store
- Moffat Communications — former cable and broadcasting company
- Mondragon Bookstore & Coffeehouse — former political bookstore and vegan cafe
- Motor Coach Industries — U.S. bus manufacturing company founded in Winnipeg. (Now owned by New Flyer.)
- NewLeaf — former virtual airline and ticket reseller
- Canada Safeway — grocer
- SAAN — discount department store chain; moved headquarters from Winnipeg and is now defunct
- Salisbury House — restaurant
- United Grain Growers — former agribusiness; became Agricore United
- Videon Cablesystems — former broadcaster
- W Network — broadcaster
- Wardrop Engineering — former civil engineering and engineering consulting firm
- Western Canada Lottery Corporation (crown corporation)
- Westfair Foods — grocer
- Winnipeg Hydro — former hydro-generation and distribution company.
