= International Travel & Health Insurance Journal =

Trade magazine

ITIJ
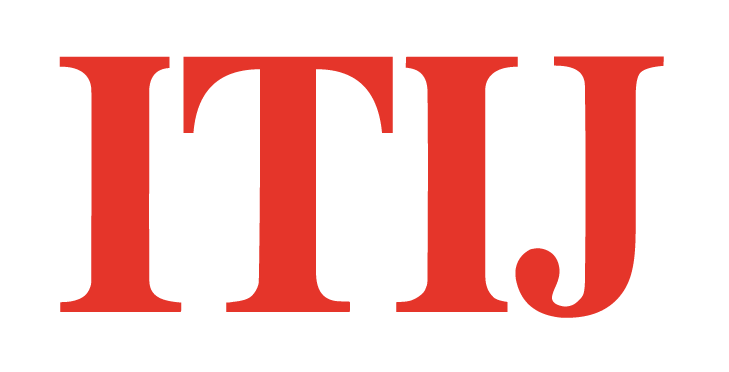
- Editor: Michelle Royle
- Categories: Insurance
- Frequency: Monthly
- Publisher: Voyageur Group
- First issue: November 1999
- Country: United Kingdom
- Based in: Bristol
- Language: English
- Website: www.itij.com

The International Travel & Health Insurance Journal (ITIJ) is a monthly, internationally distributed business-to-business magazine published by the Bristol-based Voyageur Group. The magazine serves the travel and health insurance, and international travel assistance industries. Its current editor is Michelle Royle.

ITIJ provides a mix of news and feature content, including interviews with, and Industry Voice opinion columns by leading experts in the insurance sector, and also publishes four supplements per year - two Air Ambulance Reviews, as well as two Assistance & Repatriation Reviews.

== History ==
The magazine was launched in November 1999 to complement Voyageur's annual International Travel & Health Insurance Conferences (ITIC).

== ITIC conferences ==
The International Travel & Health Insurance Conferences are a series of five annual conferences targeted at the travel and health insurance and international assistance industries.

The events typically comprise a series of talks and debates from and between industry experts, alongside a series of networking events. Additionally, the ITIC Global event hosts a trade exhibition alongside the regular conference.

The five regional events are: ITIC Global; ITIC Americas; ITIC APAC (Asia-Pacific); ITIC MEA (Middle East and Africa); and ITIC UK.

== ITIJ Awards ==
ITIJ also hosts the ITIJ Awards, a 'leading accolade for the global travel and health insurance industry' intended to reward 'companies that go above and beyond to serve their customers and clients and drive forward positive change in the industry'. The awards are presented at the end of the ITIC Global conference, and feature seven categories:

- International Travel & Health Insurer of the Year
- Assistance Company of the Year
- Air Ambulance Company of the Year
- Medical Provider of the Year
- Outstanding Industry Contribution of the Year
- Travel Insurance Product Innovation of the Year
- ITIJ Marketing Campaign of the Year.

== Sister magazine ==
ITIJ's sister publication is AirMed&Rescue, a magazine which serves the international emergency aviation sector - including search and rescue, aeromedical, aerial firefighting and police aviation.
