= SSQ =

SSQ may refer to:

- La Sarre Airport, the IATA code for the Canadian airport
- Shell Lake Municipal Airport, the FAA code for the United States airport
- Social Science Quarterly, a peer-reviewed social science journal
- SSQ, a 1980s synthpop band
- Ernie Haase & Signature Sound, also known as Signature Sound Quartet
- SSQ Financial Group, a Canadian financial institution
- Sexual satisfaction questionnaire, used to diagnose vaginal introital laxity
