= Medavie Blue Cross =

Canadian medical care insurance company

Medavie Inc.
- Type: Not-for-profit Corporation
- Industry: Health Insurance; Life Insurance
- Founded: Moncton, New Brunswick (1943)
- Headquarters: Moncton, New Brunswick
- Key people: Eric Laberge; President; Bernard Lord (CEO)
- Number of employees: 2,150 (2013, approximate)
- Website: http://www.medaviebc.ca

Medavie Blue Cross (French: Croix Bleue Medavie) is a not-for-profit Canadian medical care insurance company headquartered in Moncton, New Brunswick.

Affiliated with the Canadian Association of Blue Cross Plans, Medavie Blue Cross traces its history to E.A. van Steenwyk's 1933 creation of the Hospital Service Association of Minnesota, which became known as Blue Cross.

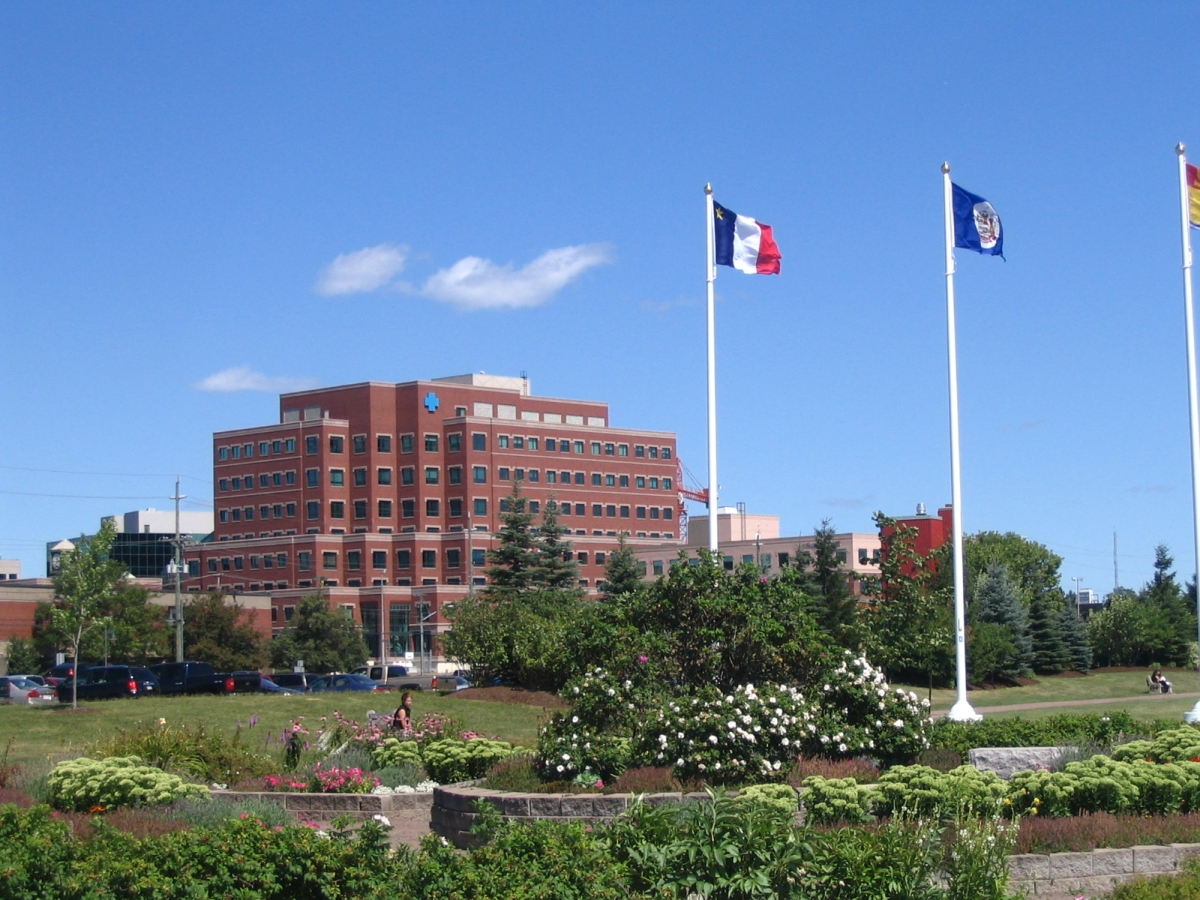
Headquarters in downtown Moncton

Blue Cross eventually found its way into Canada, which had a private health care system at that time, and the Maritime Hospital Service Association was established in 1943, which became known as the Maritime Blue Cross - Blue Shield Association in 1954. With the creation of Canada's publicly funded universal health care system in the 1960s, the Blue Cross organizations began to evolve, providing travel insurance and individual health plans to supplement the publicly funded health care provided by each province.

In 1986, the company renamed itself Blue Cross of Atlantic Canada and was headquartered in Moncton. The name was shortened to Atlantic Blue Cross Care (or just Atlantic Blue Cross) in 1999 when it merged with Maritime Medical Care, a nonprofit insurer based in Nova Scotia.

The company became extremely successful during this period when several major contracts were awarded by large companies and public sector employers for their employee benefit plans, leading to the acquisition of the group business sectors of Ontario Blue Cross and Quebec Blue Cross. This necessitated a more bilingually appropriate name, so Medavie Blue Cross or Croix Bleue Medavie was adopted in 2003 and officially implemented in 2005. The name "Medavie" is a bilingual portmanteau which includes the terms "medical" and "to live" and describes the company's products, which include medical and life insurance.

In 2007, for the third consecutive year, Medavie Blue Cross was named one of Canada's Top 100 Employers, as published in Maclean's magazine, the only non-profit medical insurance organization in Canada to receive this honour.

On June 15, 2016, former New Brunswick Premier Bernard Lord was appointed Chief Executive Officer of Medavie Incorporated, effective September 1, 2016.

Medavie Blue Cross is subsidiary of Medavie, a health organization. Medavie is a member of the Canadian Association of Blue Cross Plans (CABCP). All member plans operate independently and are governed by their own Board of Directors.

Medavie is a not-for-profit organization, that channels its annual net income into investments aimed at enhancing the experience for its clients and an annual social dividend to the Medavie Health Foundation.

== Medavie Blue Cross and the following companies are Subsidiaries of Medavie ==
- Medavie Blue Cross (Corporate Site), Blue Cross Health (Personal Health Insurance Site)
- Medavie EMS Inc.
- Medavie Health Services New Brunswick Inc
- Emergency Medical Care Inc. (EMC)
