= Canassurance Hospital Service Association =

Canadian health insurance provider

- Trade name: Blue Cross Canassurance
- Type: Nonprofit corporation
- Industry: Health insurance
- Founded: 1942
- Headquarters: Montreal, Québec
- Products: Health and dental insurance Travel Insurance; Life and Disability Insurance
- Brands: Ontario Blue Cross; Québec Blue Cross
- Number of employees: 356
- Website: qc.bluecross.ca on.bluecross.ca

The Canassurance Hospital Service Association, also called Blue Cross Canassurance, is a not-for-profit health insurance provider in Canada. It is a member of the Canadian Association of Blue Cross Plans, operating in Ontario under the brand Ontario Blue Cross and in Quebec as Québec Blue Cross (French: Croix Bleue du Québec).

It also provides travel assistance through its subsidiary CanAssistance Inc.

== History ==
The Canassurance Hospital Service Association was founded in 1942 under the name Quebec Hospital Service Association by a group of hospital directors and business people. The goal of the association was to provide workers with access to health services at a reasonable cost through an advanced reimbursement plan. Later, with the implementation of a public health system (1957) and the Régie de l'assurance maladie du Québec (1969), Blue Cross changed its plans to complement the healthcare public system.

By 1970, the Quebec Hospital Service Association had more than 1 million members throughout the province. At that time, private insurance plans were used as an argument by the Quebec administration to counterweight the Canadian government's pressure for a unique national healthcare program. For the Premier of Quebec, Maurice Duplessis, healthcare represented a provincial area of expertise. The following administrations have maintained the position that national standards would not necessarily meet local needs.

The Quebec Hospital Service Association changed its name in 1999 to Canassurance Hospital Service Association (Blue Cross Canassurance) and provides services in Ontario and Quebec.

== Community initiatives ==
Being a not-for-profit health insurance provider, Blue Cross Canassurance reinvests in research and development as well as into the community by supporting a variety of causes linked to health and wellness.

== Subsidiaries ==
- Canassurance Financial Corporation
- Canassurance Insurance Company
- CanAssistance Inc.
