= Clodhopper =

Clodhopper may refer to:

- Clodhopper (candy)
- The Clodhopper, a 1917 American comedy drama film
- Clodhopper, a dune buggy body by Fiberfab
- Clodhopper, a 1997 album by Glueleg
- "Clodhopper", a song by Th' Legendary Shack Shakers from the 2003 album Cockadoodledon't
- "Clodhopper", a song by Radarmaker from the 2006 album Drawn like Spires
- Clodhoppers, United States Navy slang for large, heavy, ankle length work shoes that are distinct from dress shoes or combat boots.

== See also ==
- Binkley Brothers' Dixie Clodhoppers, an American Old-time string band
- Agrōstīnos ('The Country-Dweller' or 'Clodhopper'), a work by Epicharmus of Kos
