= US Travel Insurance Association =

- Type: Trade association
- Industry: Travel insurance
- Founded: 2004
- Headquarters: 1300 Piccard Drive Suite LL-14, Rockville, MD, United States
- Area served: United States
- Key people: Founding President: Jonathan Michael Ansell Current President: Susan Silfen
- Website: www.ustia.org

Founded in 2004, the US Travel Insurance Association (UStiA) is a United States, registered 501(c) non-profit association of companies involved in the development, sales, marketing or implementation of travel insurance and related products and services; plus U.S. travel insurance carriers, third-party administrators and allied businesses that develop, administer and/or market travel insurance and assistance products and services.

UStiA is a primary information source about travel insurance, assistance, and related services for the US media.

== Mission ==
Among UStiA's missions are to educate consumers about travel insurance and related issues; foster ethical and professional standards of industry conduct; and cultivate government relations on behalf of the travel insurance industry.

== Goals ==
The Association's goals are to: create uniform and fair regulations for the industry; develop consistent licensing standards for agents who market travel insurance and assistance services; and serve as an advocate for the travel insurance industry.

== Consumer Advocacy ==
TRIP Logo

In accordance with the organization's mission and goals, UStiA created a consumer advocacy website, TRIP, in 2010. The acronym TRIP stands for Travel Responsibly, Informed and Protected. TRIP provides timely travel information and articles, tips and links on issues concerning travel health, safety, and security.

== Membership Standards and Categories ==
Member companies must adhere to UStiA's standards of ethical conduct and truth in advertising.

=== Membership Categories ===
UStiA has three categories of membership, Regular Member, Associate Member, and Subscriber.

Regular Members are Insurance Carriers, Third Party Administrators, Managing General Agents, Managing General Underwriters, and Administrators who are in the insurance business and derive at least 50% of their annual revenue from travel insurance.

Associate Members are Travel Assistance Companies, Air Ambulance Companies, Travel Suppliers, Companies and Professionals who provide services to the travel industry, PPOs, and Insurance Brokers and Agents who distribute travel insurance programs.

Subscriber Members include Retail Travel Agencies, Retail Travel Agents, Travel Media, Software Companies, Travel Vendors, and those individuals who have expressed an interest in the travel insurance industry.
