= SSQ Insurance =

Canadian mutual insurance company

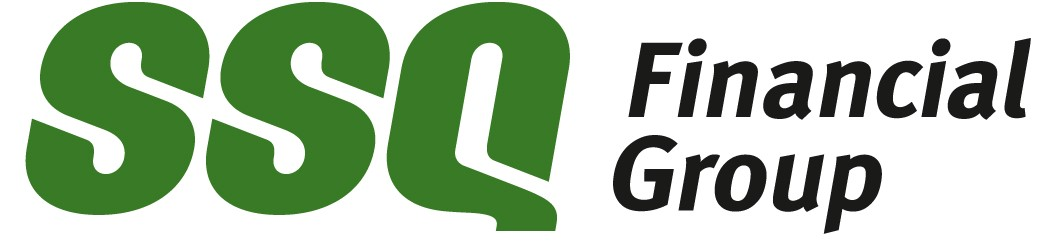

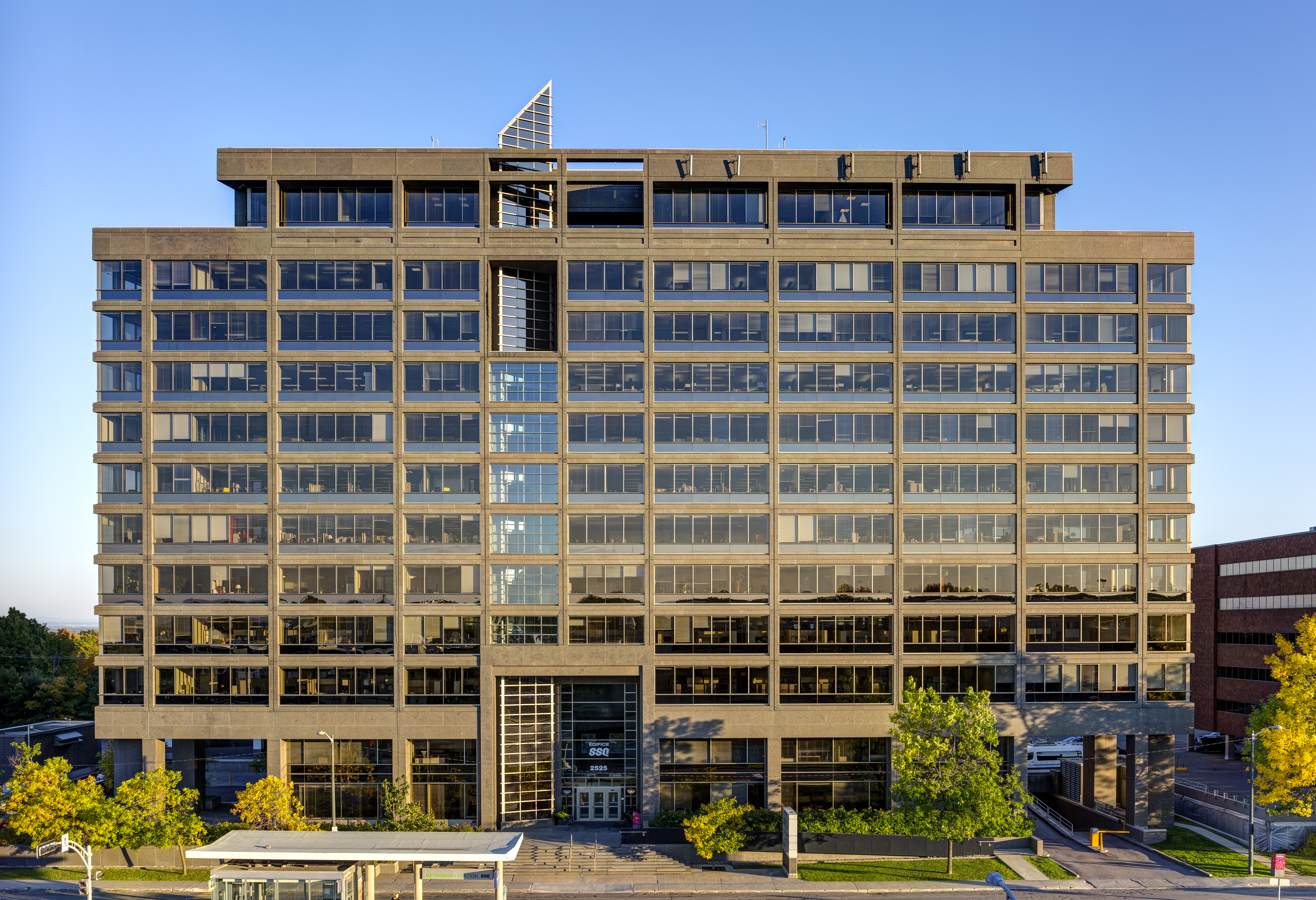
- Former SSQ Financial Group's head office, in Quebec
- Type: Mutual insurance
- Industry: Insurance, investment, real estate
- Founded: 1944; 82 years ago in Quebec City, Canada
- Founder: Jacques Tremblay
- Defunct: 2020
- Fate: Merged with La Capitale
- Successor: Beneva
- Headquarters: Quebec City, Canada
- Area served: Canada
- Key people: Jean-François Chalifoux (CEO), René Hamel (Chairman)
- Products: Group insurance, individual insurance, general insurance, investment, real estate
- Number of employees: 2,000 employees (2014)
- Parent: SSQ, Life Insurance Company Inc.
- Subsidiaries: SSQ Insurance Company Inc.; SSQ Realty Inc.
- Website: ssq.ca

SSQ Insurance (French: SSQ Assurance), was a Canadian mutual insurance company and financial institution that offered insurance and investment products. It was founded in 1944 in Quebec and was merged in 2020 to become Beneva.

SSQ Insurance was headquartered in Quebec City, with offices in Longueuil, Calgary, Halifax, Vancouver and Toronto. Prior to its merger it served over three million customers and employs 2,000 employees. It was one of the major insurance companies in Canada. SSQ Insurance was also one of the 500 largest companies in Quebec, ranking 79th in 2018.

As of 2015, business volume approached $3 billion with $11 billion in assets under management. Beneva is one of the 10 Canadian co-operatives present in the ranking of the most prominent coops worldwide.

SSQ Insurance merged with La Capitale Insurance in January 2020, to become Beneva. The announcement was made on December 3, 2020.

== History ==
=== 1940–1948: putting down roots ===
At the beginning of the 1940s, Dr. Jacques Tremblay out of concern for social justice took up the cause of Quebec City's working class, who could not afford adequate medical care. There was no public medical plan. On May 9, 1944, Dr. Tremblay founded the Coopérative de santé du Québec, which provided needed medical care to members. In 1945, the cooperative changed its name to Les Services de Santé du Québec, hence inspiration for the later SSQ.

=== 1949–1960: a new vocation ===
Starting in the 1950s, the cooperative shifted its focus towards business development and customer service. Contributions would be based on each group's risk profile, and sales agents positioned themselves as advisors. As early as 1955, to diversify its products and pursue its growth objectives, the cooperative changed status to become a mutual aid company specialized in group insurance. The company expanded its customer and geographical base at the start of the 1950s, offering new products such as life insurance and disability insurance.

=== 1961–1973: Quebec society undergoing change ===
In 1961, further to the implementation of the public hospital insurance plan, SSQ adjusted by offering services not covered by the plan and innovated by providing coverage for private and semi-private hospital rooms, surgery fees and extended coverage for doctor's visits. SSQ added disability insurance in 1963. At the end of the 1960s, its products and services were diversified to meet the public's needs: additional annuity plans; dental, vision and chiropractic care; and prescription drug insurance. In 1969, SSQ moved its head office to Boulevard Laurier in Quebec City. The introduction of health insurance in 1970 represented both a significant advance for society and a new challenge for SSQ.

=== 1974–1985: growth and democracy ===
In 1974, the Act Respecting Insurance changed SSQ's status, turning it into a mutual life insurance company. At the end of the 1970s, regional assemblies were set up, and regional delegates were elected to represent their groups at the annual general meeting. The company's assets topped the $100 million mark in 1979. In addition to launching mortgage loans, SSQ also created a real estate subsidiary in 1982.

=== 1986–1995: general insurance and restructuring ===
By member request, a general insurance subsidiary was created in 1986. In 1991, SSQ Mutual was split in two to create SSQ, Mutual Management Corporation and SSQ, Life Insurance Company Inc. In 1992, following the global real estate crisis and significant losses, the Fonds de solidarité FTQ became SSQ's principal shareholder, helping the company to quickly get back on its feet.

=== 1996–2002: prescription drug insurance and Canadian debut ===
The introduction of the mixed public and private plan in 1997 profoundly changed this sector of the insurance market. In 2000, SSQ signed an agreement with its first panCanadian group. To reflect its sustained growth and broadening scope, the company changed its name to SSQ Financial Group in 2001, and the Canadian venture continued with new offices opening in Toronto in 2002.

=== 2003 to 2020: growth and expansion ===
In 2003, SSQ Financial Group was named among the 50 best managed companies in Canada. SSQ also launched its Health InSight program in a bid to be actively involved in the health and wellbeing of its customers, and received authorization to offer individual savings plans in Ontario and to organizations with a federal jurisdiction. In 2012, SSQ and the Fonds de solidarité FTQ jointly acquired AXA Life Insurance, and renamed it SSQ Insurance. The transaction added products and services to SSQ's offering, in addition to rebalancing the company's internal organization and positioning it within the Canadian market. SSQ Financial Group has acquired several other companies in recent years, including Finance & Indemnisation and assurancevoyages.ca.

SSQ Tower, located in Longueuil, was inaugurated in 2016.

In 2017 a decision by SSQ Insurance came under criticism by medical professionals and popular newspapers. It involves the denial of the claim of paralysis through injuries sustained in a 7 meters fall. At the time, the patient was covered under against paralysis under his mothers' insurance policy. SSQ Insurance has since been sued in connection with this decision.

In 2018, SSQ Financial Group changes its name and becomes SSQ Insurance. This change reflects the primary purpose of SSQ and ensures a positioning of the company in Canada.

=== 2020: Merger and end ===
In January 2020, SSQ Insurance merged with La Capitale Insurance to become Beneva, which saw the end of SSQ Insurance name.

== Products and services ==
SSQ Insurance offered financial products and services across Canada:

- Group insurance (life insurance; death and dismemberment; disability insurance; prescription drug insurance; health insurance; travel insurance and trip cancellation insurance; dental care insurance; compassion insurance; health and wellness program; individual insurance – retirement and end of employment; critical illness; long-term care; expatriate insurance)
- Individual insurance (term life insurance; permanent life insurance; universal life insurance; credit insurance; critical illness insurance; travel insurance and trip cancellation insurance)
- General insurance (auto insurance; replacement insurance; home insurance; business insurance)
- Investment (segregated funds; guaranteed interest accounts (GIA); individual savings and retirement plans: Registered Retirement Savings Plan (RRSP), Tax-Free Savings Account (TFSA), locked-in RRSP, Non-Registered Savings Plan (NRSP), Individual Pension Plan (IPP), Registered Retirement Income Fund (RRIF), locked-in RRIF and annuity; registered retirement plan without member management, private wealth management)
- Real estate: development and management of SSQ Insurance's real estate properties including property in Quebec City, Longueuil and Toronto.

== Company structure ==
SSQ Insurance was made up of three companies: the parent company SSQ, Life Insurance Company Inc. and its two affiliates:

- SSQ Insurance Company Inc.
- SSQ Realty Inc.

On January 1, 2017, SSQ General Insurance Company Inc. (SSQ's previous P&C insurance arm) was merged into SSQ Insurance Company Inc.

== Donations and sponsorships ==
SSQ Insurance was the title sponsor of the SSQ Quebec City Marathon and presenter of the SSQ Health 5K. This activity raises funds for organizations in the health sector.

SSQ partnered with the SSQ Longueuil Marathon as the title sponsor of the event.

== See also ==
- Insurance
- List of Canadian insurance companies
