= Quebec City Marathon =

Annual race in Canada held since 1998

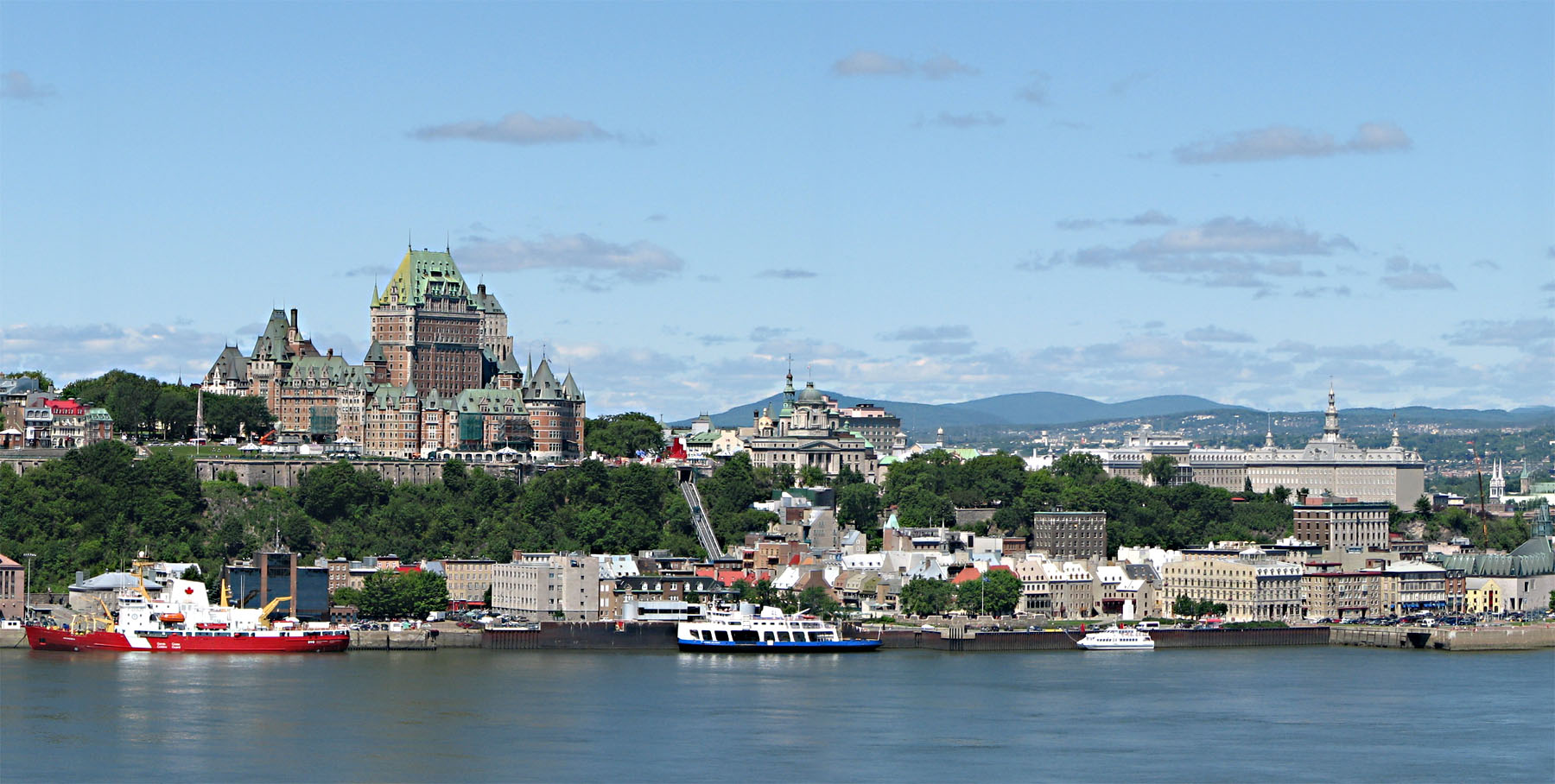
- The Quebec City Marathon runs along both the northern and southern shores of the St. Lawrence River
- Date: October
- Location: Lévis — Quebec City, Quebec, Canada.
- Event type: Road
- Distance: Marathon
- Primary sponsor: Beneva
- Established: 1998
- Course records: Men's: 2:23:06 (2001) (Kenya) Joseph Ngunjiri; Women's: 2:39:03 (1999) (Canada) Veronique Vandersmissen
- Website: Quebec City Marathon
- Participants: 1,096 (2019)

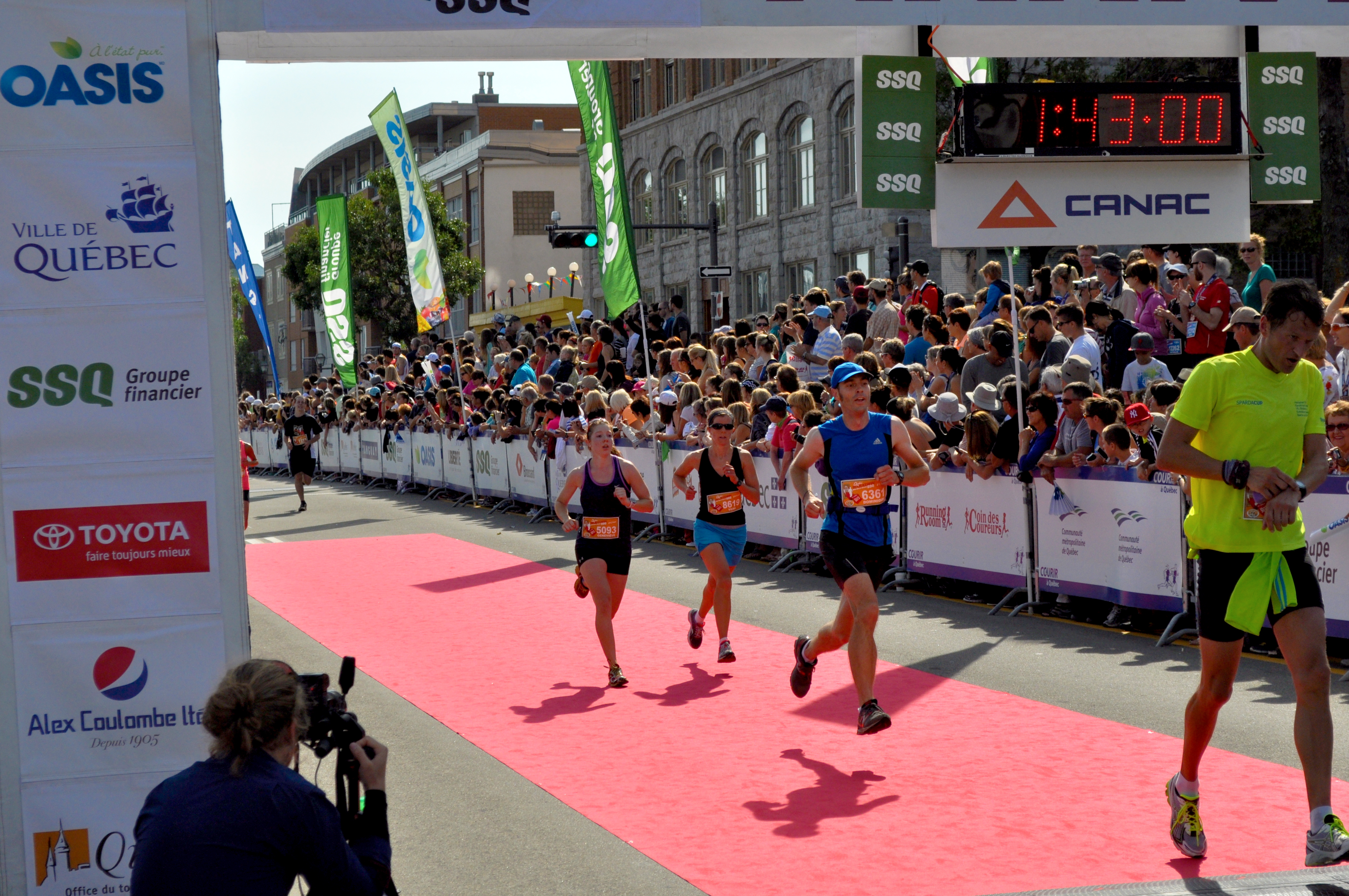
Quebec City Marathon in 2013.

The Beneva Quebec City Marathon (French: Marathon Beneva Québec), is an annual point-to-point Boston Marathon qualifying marathon (42.195 km/26.219 mi) race between Lévis and Quebec City, Quebec, Canada. It has been held in October every year since 1998 and currently can reach up to 12,700 participants in all of the events combined. Along with the full marathon, a half marathon, a 10 km, a 5 km and children's events are arranged as well.

The course distinguishes itself from other races in that kilometre markers are posted in reverse order, indicating the remaining distance to the finish line. Among other things, this allows all events to start at the same time and on the same course, from the appropriate distance away from the finish line.

The race is part of a series of races that go on around Quebec City each year called "Run Quebec City", with the Quebec City Marathon being the most well known event. Other events in the series include the Oasis International Half Marathon each May, the Quebec City Staircase Challenge, including many staircases on a 19 km or 13.5 km course, each June, the Descente Royale (which was postponed in 2013), the Bataille des Plainesa, a 5 km, 10 km and children's race, each June, and the Desjardins Ladies Challenge, a 5 km, 10 km and children's race, each July.

The 2020 in-person edition of the race was cancelled due to the coronavirus pandemic, and the 2021 edition of the race was cancelled after the city pulled funding for the marathon. Full refunds for registrants were offered in both cases.

== Information ==
The race also features a spectacular event two days before the actual marathon race known as the SSQ Star Race. The race is giant loop which participants may run as many times as they wish within the hour and a half available. The race begins at night, usually around 8pm, and for the first hour and fifteen minutes a musical show will be put on around the course, which is well lit up by many multi-coloured lights, including the LED caps given to each participant. After an hour and thirty-five minutes, just five minutes after the participants finish running, a firework show begins to light up the night sky.

The race is often known for its flashy well-designed medals, given to participants in each event, including the SSQ Star Race and Kids Run.

The top three placers in the marathon, half marathon, 10 km, 5 km, and kids run, are also given prize money ranging from $5000 for first in the full marathon, to $50 for the winner of the kids run.

== Past winners ==
=== Marathon ===
Key: Course record

Edition	Year	Men's winner	Time (h:m:s)	Women's winner	Time (h:m:s)	Rf.
1st	1998	Mario Cormier (CAN)	2:27:30	Veronique Vandersmissen (CAN)	2:44:52	
2nd	1999	Miguel Sanchez (CAN)	2:29:55	Veronique Vandersmissen (CAN)	2:39:03	
3rd	2000	Joseph Ngunjiri (KEN)	2:26:50	Louise Voghel (CAN)	2:57:00	
4th	2001	Joseph Ngunjiri (KEN)	2:23:06	Veronique Vandersmissen (CAN)	2:43:16	
5th	2002	Jean-Paul Niyonsaba (BDI)	2:25:57	Lourdes Cruz (PUR)	2:56:54	
6th	2003	Shingirai Badza (ZIM)	2:33:05	Barbara McManus (USA)	2:51:51	
7th	2004	Moses Cheserek (KEN)	2:28:34	Louise Voghel (CAN)	3:02:50	
8th	2005	Richard Tessier (CAN)	2:29:40	Nathalie Goyer (CAN)	2:59:07	
9th	2006	Fethi Oukid (ALG)	2:30:31	Nathalie Goyer (CAN)	3:01:13	
10th	2007	Amor Dehbi (ALG)	2:24:07	Nathalie Goyer (CAN)	2:55:38	
11th	2008	Michael Njoroge (KEN)	2:23:46	Suzanne Munger (CAN)	3:10:07	
12th	2009	David Savard-Gagnon (CAN)	2:27:08	Andrée Paquet (CAN)	2:55:02	
13th	2010	Louis-Philippe Garnier (CAN)	2:39:29	Nathalie Goyer (CAN)	2:57:42	
–	2011	Not held				
14th	2012	Thomas Omwenga (KEN)	2:28:36	Anne Jelagat (KEN)	2:53:40	
15th	2013	Evans Momanyi (KEN)	2:26:28	Maryse Nault (CAN)	2:54:48	
16th	2014	Evans Momanyi (KEN)	2:36:46	Joanne Normand (CAN)	3:06:34	
17th	2015	Christopher Zablocki (USA)	2:25:36	Joanne Normand (CAN)	3:02:00	
18th	2016	Ebisa Merga (ETH)	2:30:42	Andrée Paquet (CAN)	2:50:49	
19th	2017	Dadi Tesfaye (ETH)	2:23:14	Lydia Orozco (ESP)	2:52:49	
20th	2018	Mohamed Aagab (MAR)	2:28:30	Caroline Poitras (CAN)	2:55:50	
21st	2019	David Mutai (KEN)	2:25:34	Carolyn Shaw (USA)	3:05:40	
	2020	cancelled due to coronavirus pandemic				
	2021	cancelled due to financial issues				

=== Half-marathon ===
Half-marathon results - winners
Date	Male winners	Time	Female winners	Time
2019	Jean Marie Uwajeneza (RWA)	1 h 08 min 40 s	Karine Lefebvre (CAN)	1 h 21 min 23 s
2018	Jean Marie Uwajeneza (RWA)	1 h 07 min 36 s	Salome Nyirarukundo (RWA)	1 h 15 min 25 s
2017	John Murray (USA)	1 h 09 min 07 s	Jara Dehininet (ETH)	1 h 15 min 13 s
2016	Anthony Larouche (CAN)	1 h 07 min 50 s	Jane Murage (KEN)	1 h 20 min 47 s
2015	Dancan Kasia (KEN)	1 h 08 min 26 s	Gabrielle Wheeler (USA)	1 h 22 min 26 s
2014	Berhanu Degefa (CAN)	1 h 05 min 10 s	Marilou Ferland-Daigle (CAN)	1 h 24 min 56 s
2013	Baghdad Rachem (ALG)	1 h 09 min 05 s	Marie-Caroline Cote (CAN)	1 h 24 min 43 s
2012	Josephat Ongeri (KEN)	1 h 06 min 23 s	Lucy Njeri (KEN)	1 h 19 min 03 s
2011	Rejean Chiasson (CAN)	1 h 11 min 06 s	Lucy Njeri (KEN)	1 h 20 min 09 s
2010	Said Ali Hadji (ALG)	1 h 10 min 33 s	Karine Lefebvre (CAN)	1 h 21 min 56 s
2009	Kibet Rutto (KEN)	1 h 04 min 40 s	Krista DuChene (CAN)	1 h 19 min 14 s
2008	Josephat Ongeri (KEN)	1 h 07 min 53 s	Josiane Aboungono (GAB)	1 h 21 min 57 s
2007	Giitah Macharia (ETH)	1 h 08 min 25 s	Josiane Aboungono (GAB)	1 h 23 min 29 s
2006	Henry Githuk (KEN)	1 h 07 min 13 s	Josiane Aboungono (GAB)	1 h 21 min 10 s
2005	Danny Kassap (DRC)	1 h 05 min 46 s	Josiane Aboungono (GAB)	1 h 20 min 23 s
2004	Giitah Macharia (ETH)	1 h 08 min 31 s	Emily Le Van (USA)	1 h 20 min 27 s
2003	Mustapha Bennacer (ALG)	1 h 03 min 28 s	Atsuko Sugawara (CHN)	1 h 19 min 35 s
2002	Denis Cloutier (CAN)	1 h 10 min 21 s	Emily Le Van (USA)	1 h 21 min 29 s
2001	François Marceau (CAN)	1 h 11 min 13 s	Stephanie Andrews (CAN)	1 h 22 min 56 s
2000	François Marceau (CAN)	1 h 13 min 13 s	Marie-Helene Vandersmissen (CAN)	1 h 28 min 52 s

== See also ==
- List of marathon races in North America
