= ScotiaLife Financial =

Canadian insurance company

- Type: Subsidiary
- Industry: Insurance
- Founded: 2009; 17 years ago
- Founder: Scotiabank
- Headquarters: Toronto, Canada
- Area served: Canada
- Products: Life insurance
- Parent: Scotiabank
- Website: www.scotiainsurance.com

ScotiaLife Financial is a Canadian insurance company that is a subsidiary of Scotiabank (also known as Bank of Nova Scotia.

Through this brand, Scotiabank Group markets commercial insurance products to the general public, predominantly individuals and families. The company offers insurance products ranging from life insurance, health insurance, auto insurance, travel insurance, and general insurance.

== Policies ==
Life insurance policies sold via ScotiaLife Financial are underwritten by Scotia Life Insurance Company. In fact, Scotia Life Insurance Company is a subsidiary of Scotiabank and is the underwriter for all insurance policies sold by the Bank.

ScotiaLife insurance policies cannot be purchased in Scotiabank branches.

=== Life insurance ===
ScotiaLife does not offer permanent life insurance policies, only term life insurance plans. The term plans can be taken out for one, 10 or 20 years. There is a quasi-permanent term life insurance policy that will stop collecting premiums after the client turns 100 years old. The maximum total insurance coverage allowed per client is $500,000 for any combination of the long-term life insurance plans.

=== Accidental death insurance ===
Available insurance benefits range from $2,000 to $350,000 and come in $25,000 intervals. The benefit amounts of ScotiaLife clients are halved at age 75 and the Insurer will cease to offer insurance protection to 80-year-old clients and older. While ScotiaLife states that accidents are the 5th most common cause of death in Canada, they in fact only amount to 4.23% of deaths in the country.

As is common with accidental death policies, ScotiaLife's policy does not cover accidents occurring while the client is under the influence of drugs not prescribed by a doctor, illegal drugs, or alcohol. Also exempt are suicide, overdose with toxic or poisonous substances, injury of an athlete during a professional sporting event, and war-related injuries and accidents. Natural death or death due to illness are not covered either. Due to these limitations, the process of claiming the policy benefit may be relatively difficult and will likely require post-mortem medical assessment of the deceased and official investigation of the accident.

=== Health insurance ===
ScotiaLife has three categories of health insurance in its portfolio. There is hospitalization insurance, critical illness insurance, and health & dental insurance.

== See also ==
- Scotiabank
- Scotiabank Place
- Scotia Plaza
- Scotiabank Saddledome
- Manulife Financial
- Sun Life Financial
- Life insurance
- Term life insurance
- Financial District, Toronto
