= Jonathan Michael Ansell =

American businessperson (born 1950)

Jonathan M. Ansell
- Born: August 13, 1950 (age 75); Binghamton, New York United States
- Education: Colgate University, Wharton School of the University of Pennsylvania
- Occupations: Investor; entrepreneur; chief executive
- Employer(s): Merlinio Insurance Services, Bangz Music
- Known for: Travel Insurance, Insurtech, Data Analytics

Jonathan M. Ansell (born August 13, 1950) is an American entrepreneur, investor and CEO in the insurance, insurtech, health care and music industries. His current business interests include Merlinio Insurance Services and Bangz Music.

Previously Ansell was the President, CEO and co-founder of Access America and World Access, two companies that were later acquired by, and rebranded to, Allianz PartnersUSA, the largest travel insurance company in the US and American specialty insurer Jefferson Insurance Company. Post-acquisition, Ansell was additionally a member of the global management board of Allianz Partners, (formerly Allianz Global Assistance and Mondial Assistance) based in Paris, France.

Ansell was also the founder and CEO of insurtech companies MagicQuote, an online digital insurance agency and technology platform serving the millennial market; SuCasa Health, a digital home health care remote monitoring firm; and Fusion Company, a global digital merchandising provider that pioneered the use of real-time data analytics and machine learning to optimize add-on insurance products for online retailers and their customers. Fusion is now a division of Allianz Partners.

Earlier, he was an executive for the Broome County Medical Society, an affiliate of the American Medical Association, and Empire Blue Cross and Blue Shield, now an Anthem company.

In 2004 Ansell co-founded and served as the first president of the US Travel Insurance Association, the trade association of American insurers, brokers and administrators specializing in travel insurance. He has been cited as a "visionary" in the travel insurance industry and is a frequent business speaker.

In 2015, Ansell co-founded and chaired Friends of Wintergreen, a Virginia not-for-profit organization established to fight the planned installation of Dominion Energy's Atlantic Coast Pipeline in Nelson County, VA. Dominion and its partners abandoned the project on July 5, 2020. With its primary objective completed, Friends of Wintergreen was repurposed to the Wintergreen Community Foundation.

Ansell was born and grew up in Binghamton, New York. He graduated with a BA in economics from Colgate University in 1972 and an MBA from the Wharton School of the University of Pennsylvania in 1977.
