= Ontario Hospital Association =

Hospital association in Ontario, Canada

- Type: Nonprofit
- Industry: Healthcare
- Founded: Toronto, Canada (1924)
- Headquarters: Toronto, Canada
- Key people: Anthony Dale (President and CEO); Marcia Visser (Board Chair, 2012–2013)
- Website: oha.com

The Ontario Hospital Association (OHA) is a member association that represents approximately 154 public hospitals in Ontario, Canada.

== History ==
At the request of Dr. Fred W. Routley, then the Ontario Director of the Canadian Red Cross, a group of hospital workers met on 13th December 1923 at the Toronto Academy of Medicine to establish the OHA. The 58 attendees consisted of hospital physicians, nurses, superintendents, business managers, trustees and association executives. The attendees also agreed that the organization's first convention would be held the following fall. That convention was held on 2nd - 3rd October 1924. Registered participants in these events totaled 106.

In 1927, the President of the OHA noted that it was neither useful nor realistic to continue the association. According to David and Rosemary Gagan in "For Patients of Moderate Means: A Social History of the Voluntary Public General Hospital in Canada", the objective was not to deny indigent patients access to hospital care, but to appeal to middle-class self-interest to spur statutory changes in government social policy.

=== Reports and proposals ===
In a 1936 study (Ontario Survey of General Hospitals, 1940) undertaken by the Ontario Department of Health during the Depression, it was written that lengths-of-stay (LOS) for the poor and indigent patients increased, while LOS decreased for paying patients.

In 1943, Prime Minister WLM King created an Advisory Committee on Health Insurance to consult on the issue, which consequently produced the Heagarty Committee Report. In the meantime, private carriers and not-for-profit organizations such as Blue Cross, which was organized by the Canadian Hospital Association, had begun to provide voluntary group hospitalization insurance coverage through employers. On a provincial level, as early as the 1940s, the OHA began to step up for funds. One of the proposed solutions at the time was universal hospital insurance, which the OHA generally supported.

In 1957, Ontario Premier Leslie M. Frost tabled the Ontario memorandum and proposal on hospital care insurance before the Ontario Legislature. During his speech, he publicly acknowledged a body of experts who helped conduct studies related to this proposal, which included the executive of the Ontario Hospital Association and the Blue Cross. He added that as part of the conditions of implementation, the plan was to be "administered by the Ontario Hospital Service Commission, either through the agency of the Blue Cross or by a crown corporation similar to the Blue Cross, and by personnel drawn from the Ontario Hospital Association." In 1959, the government of Ontario launched the Ontario Hospital Insurance Plan. 600 Blue Cross employees, as well as most of its top management team, moved over to guide the plan.

== Executives ==
Anthony Dale is the current president and chief executive officer, appointed to the position in December 2013. Dominic Giroux is the 2023–2024 chair of the board.
