= Travel assistance =

Travel assistance is a term in use throughout much of the world which refers to a service which provides help, primarily in medical emergencies during travel.

Travel assistance is different from medical, travel or trip cancellation insurance. Travel assistance programs arrange and pay for members away from home (usually a set distance of 100 miles or so, varying by provider) to find and obtain emergency medical care in an unfamiliar place, and to return members home when stabilized.

When travellers experience a medical emergency, they can call the assistance company to receive help. The assistance program may be called first, or after the individual has been taken by local emergency services to the hospital.

The assistance representative talks with the member and/or any medical providers that may be involved, and makes recommendations based on the details. Medical personnel at the assistance company make health care decisions in conjunction with the local treating physicians. Any variety of resources may be called into play to solve a travel medical challenge.

Types of assistance programs include:

- Retail: Many assistance companies sell in partnership with insurers or direct to consumers.
- Credit cards: Some credit cards offer travel assistance.
- Travel industry programs: Ticket agents and tour operators will sometimes attach travel assistance to their products.
- Corporate: Large-scale employers sometimes work directly with assistance companies to have their own customized plans.

== See also ==
- Travel insurance
- Emergency medical services
- Air ambulance
