= Quebec Blue Cross =

Québec Blue Cross
- Québec Blue Cross Logo
- Product type: Health Insurance and Travel Insurance
- Current owner: Canassurance Hospital Service Association
- Introduced: 1942
- Markets: Quebec
- Website: qc.bluecross.ca

Québec Blue Cross is a registered trademark in Health Insurance. It is owned by Canassurance Hospital Service Association, a member of the Canadian Association of Blue Cross Plans.

== History ==
The Blue Cross Plan was introduced in 1942 by the Quebec Hospital Service Association, now named the Canassurance Hospital Service Association. The goal was to provide workers with access to health services at a reasonable cost and through an advanced reimbursement plan. The Blue Cross prepaid plan was based on similar Blue Cross plans offered in the United States that covered hospital care for their members, including diagnosis, treatment and surgical services.

From its inception as a non-profit voluntary insurance plan, the Blue Cross Plan rose very fast, collecting 38% of Quebec's premiums in health insurance by 1950. It was the non profit purpose of Blue Cross that fueled its growth. It allowed Blue Cross to overcome the moral debate of making healthcare a lucrative market, especially at a time where healthcare was largely in the hands of the Catholic Church in the province of Quebec. Its quick success can be attributed to its exclusive partnerships with hospitals, the backing of major corporations and the support from physician associations.

The following years were characterised by an increase in competition from commercial plans, the explosion of insurance and medical costs and a decrease in enrollments. In Quebec, the insurance industry failed to extend its protection to lower-class workers and the coalition that initially supported Blue Cross over a state intervention faded.

With the implementation of the Régie de l'assurance maladie du Québec in 1969, Québec Blue Cross had to adapt its services offering to offer benefits complementing those provided by the public healthcare plan. In 1977, Québec Blue Cross launched its travel insurance to provide medical insurance coverage to insured members travelling outside their province of residence. By 1996, Québec Blue Cross covered nearly 50% of the travel insurance market in the province.

Over the years, Canassurance Hospital Service Association developed business lines in other general insurance products with over 1.4 million Canadians benefitting from the Group’s different services in 1995. In 1996, however, the organisation decided to refocus its efforts around Québec Blue Cross by selling other assets. From its inception in the province and in North America, the blue cross has been a symbol of Health Insurance and travel insurance products.
