= Vaginal introital laxity =

Vaginal laxity

Vaginal laxity is a symptom of pelvic floor dysfunction characterised by a sensation of looseness of the vagina.

== Diagnosis ==
=== Physical examination ===
Healthcare providers will perform pelvic examinations to assess the vaginal tissue. Patients are first asked to empty their bladders to improve access to the pelvic organs, and to alleviate any discomfort or pressure that may arise from a full bladder during the examination. They are then placed in a supine position, usually lying on their back on birthing chairs at 45 degrees with their feet in stirrups, allowing the legs to be comfortably positioned. This position is called the dorsal lithotomy position, which is most commonly used in genital examination. In some cases, alternative positions such as the supine frog leg position or the prone knee chest position may be used. The speculum is available in different sizes and shapes to accommodate individual anatomy.

Moreover, pelvic floor assessment may be used to evaluate the strength and tone of the muscles. This may involve requesting patients to perform specific movements, such as contracting and relaxing the pelvic floor muscles, coughing, or bearing down. This helps evaluate the muscle function and identify any issues or weaknesses.

=== Vaginal laxity questionnaire ===
A vaginal laxity questionnaire (VLQ) is designed to evaluate the degree of perceived vaginal looseness. The questionnaire covers several aspects:

- Physical symptoms: sensations of looseness, lack of tightness, or reduced friction during sexual intercourse
- Sexual function: changes in sexual satisfaction, orgasmic intensity, or sexual desire due to vaginal laxity
- Impact on quality of life: impact of vaginal laxity on self-esteem, body image, and overall well-being
- Emotional well-being: feelings of embarrassment, discomfort, or distress related to vaginal introital laxity

=== Sexual satisfaction questionnaire ===
A sexual satisfaction questionnaire (SSQ) is used to assess sexual quality of life and sexual function.

== Treatment ==
The United States Food and Drug Administration has issued a warning against the use of energy-based (laser and radiofrequency) devices to treat vaginal laxity, as its safety and efficacy need further investigation. Laser and radiofrequency treatments do not improve sexual function, and vaginal tightening does not increase sensation. Pelvic floor muscle strength was improved after treatment.
