= Monsanto Canada =

Defunct Canadian division of Monsanto

Monsanto Canada Inc. was the Canadian division of now-defunct Monsanto Company, headquartered in Winnipeg, Manitoba. In addition to seed products, Monsanto sold herbicides including Roundup. The global headquarters of Monsanto was located in the American city of St. Louis.

In October 2008, Monsanto Canada was named one of "Canada's Top 100 Employers" by Mediacorp Canada Inc., and was featured in Maclean's newsmagazine.

Monsanto was acquired by Bayer in 2016 after which Monsanto Canada was amalgamated into Bayer's Canadian agricultural division.
