= Les Productions Rivard =

Les Productions Rivard is an independent film and television production company based in Winnipeg, Manitoba, Canada. It was founded in 1995 by Louis Paquin and Charles Lavack. Together, their goal was to produce television and film productions in French for the Canadian and international market.

The company took its name from Father Léon Rivard, the first French filmmaker in Western Canada.

== Filmography ==
With the Eyes of an Angel (2005) (TV)

Building an Icon: The Story of the Provencher Bridge (2005) (TV)

"Canada à la carte" (2002)

"Unique au monde" (2000)
