= Scott-Bathgate Ltd. =

Canadian foodstuff manufacturer

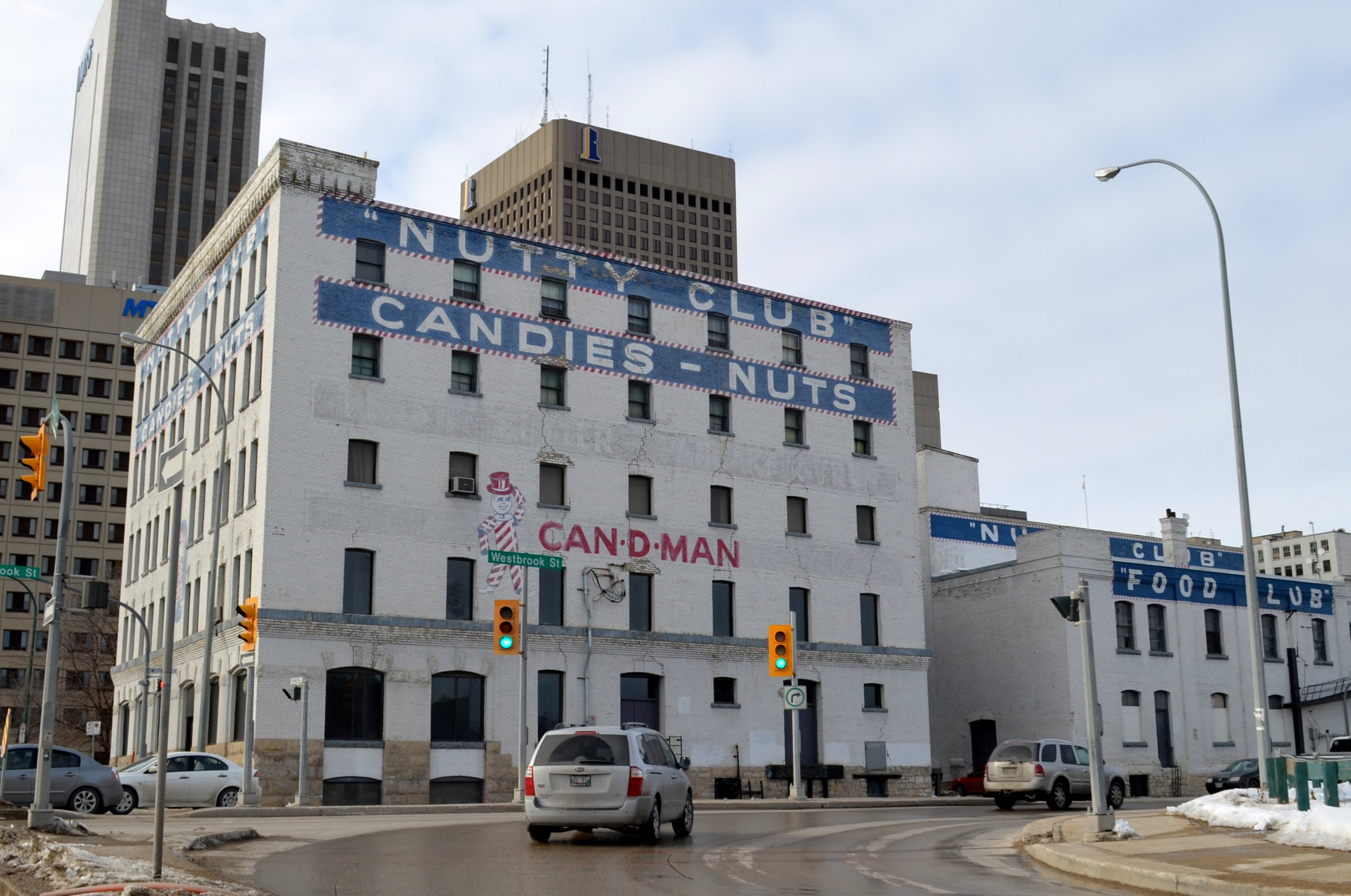
- Scott-Bathgate headquarters in downtown Winnipeg
- Founded: 1903; 123 years ago
- Headquarters: 149 Pioneer Ave, Winnipeg, Manitoba R3C 2M8
- Products: Candy, nuts, popcorn, baking products, grocery items
- Brands: Nutty Club; Food Club
- Website: scottbathgate.com

Scott-Bathgate Limited is a Canadian-based direct-selling manufacturer, distributor, and importer of confectionery, specialty grocery, and other foodstuffs. It is known for its Nutty Club brand of candy, syrup and nut products, as well as its Food Club line of condiments and food colouring. Headquartered in Winnipeg, Manitoba, the company services Canada from British Columbia to Ontario, and has warehouse facilities in Winnipeg; Regina, SK; Calgary and Edmonton, AB; and Delta, BC.

The company logo and mascot is "Can-D-Man", a man made up of lengths of candy cane.

== History ==
The company was established in 1903 by A. E. Scott and James Loughrin Bathgate. In the 1930s, Scott-Bathgate expanded, opening branch offices, warehouses, and factories across Canada.

In 1905, Scott and Bathgate built the current building at 149 Pioneer Avenue, which was added to in 1907. In 1945, Scott-Bathgate bought the Thomas Black Building at 80 Lombard, which was originally constructed for the Union Shoe and Leather Company. The building comprises three sections built in 1896, 1898, and 1907. In January 2007, the company moved most of its production and distribution business to the former T. Eaton Company warehouse between Alexander and Galt Avenues, out from the Nutty Club building at 149 Pioneer Ave and the Lombard building.
