= Pacific Blue Cross =

Health insurance provider in Canada

PBC Health Benefits Society
- Trade name: Pacific Blue Cross
- Company type: Nonprofit corporation
- Industry: Health insurance
- Predecessors: Medical Services Association; Credit Union & Cooperative Health Services Society
- Founded: 1997; 29 years ago
- Headquarters: Burnaby, British Columbia
- Key people: Sarah Hoffman (CEO)
- Website: www.pac.bluecross.ca

PBC Health Benefits Society, operating as Pacific Blue Cross, is a not-for-profit health insurance provider headquartered in Burnaby, British Columbia, Canada.

== History ==
Affiliated with the Canadian Association of Blue Cross Plans, Pacific Blue Cross dates back to the 1940s, when its predecessor organizations – the Medical Services Association (MSA) and CU&C (Credit Union & Cooperative) Health Services Society – were founded. Both companies grew steadily and successfully dealt with major challenges, including the introduction of Medicare and the merger that brought the two former competitors together as Pacific Blue Cross in 1997.

Now Pacific Blue Cross, with its subsidiary Work and Wellness, formerly branded "BC Life" (British Columbia Life & Casualty Company), provides health, dental, life, disability, travel and other health insurance products to approximately 1 in 3 British Columbians enrolled in group and individual plans. In 2015, Pacific Blue Cross was named the 15th Most Loved Brand in British Columbia by BC Business. In 2016, Pacific Blue Cross was named one of BC's Top Employers. In 2017, Pacific Blue Cross and their unionized staff (under CUPE1816) could not reach a new collective bargaining agreement. The labour dispute ended in September after an agreement was reached on a new 6 year contract. Following the departure of Jan K. Grude, John Crawford was appointed President and CEO in August 2018.

== Community initiatives ==
The Pacific Blue Cross health foundation supports organizations throughout British Columbia that help improve health outcomes. Notable initiatives of Pacific Blue Cross include Text-Blue-Wish in support of the Children's Wish Foundation of Canada and Share the Care which celebrated their 75th anniversary by donating $75,000.
