= Sovereign General Insurance Company =

Canadian insurance company

The Sovereign General Insurance Company
- Trade name: Sovereign Insurance
- Formerly: Merit Insurance
- Type: Subsidiary
- Industry: Insurance
- Founded: 1953
- Headquarters: Calgary, Alberta, Canada
- Key people: Colette Taylor, COO
- Number of employees: 450 (2026)
- Parent: Co-operators General Insurance
- Website: sovereigninsurance.ca

The Sovereign General Insurance Company, operating as Sovereign Insurance, is a Canadian property and casualty insurance company specializing in commercial lines. They offer full-service branches across Canada, including Vancouver, Calgary, Winnipeg, Toronto, Montreal and Halifax.

Today, The Sovereign has approximately 450 employees operating across the country. The Sovereign operates through a national independent brokerage network.

== History ==
Established in May 1953 as Merit Insurance Company, a subsidiary of Industrial Acceptance Corporation (IAC) and based in Montreal, the company originally focused primarily on personal lines of insurance. By the end of the 1960s, Merit Insurance had grown to employ almost one hundred staff with branch offices in several cities across Canada. The company moved its operations to Toronto in 1969, where another IAC subsidiary was housed, The Sovereign Life Insurance Company. By 1974, the two companies merged, with Merit Insurance becoming The Sovereign General Insurance Company.

By the late 1970s, a Calgary businessman purchased The Sovereign General from IAC; in 1979, its operations were moved to Calgary.

In 1984, The Sovereign changed its strategic direction and began to emphasize commercial lines of insurance, distributing its products solely through independent brokers across Canada. The 1980s would bring more changes to The Sovereign, when it was acquired by The Co-operators in April 1987, becoming a member of the co-operatively-owned group of insurance and financial services companies.

As of 2026, Sovereign has over 450 staff operating in six offices across Canada.

== Awards and recognition ==
- February 25, 2010 - The Sovereign was awarded Best Overall Workplace (100 - 750 Employees) by Alberta Venture
- 2012 - Ranked 30th in the Top 50 Best Small and Medium Employers by Aon Hewitt. As well as one of the Top 30 Green Companies by Maclean's.
- 2013 - Ranked 17th in the Top 50 Best Small and Medium Employers in Canada by Aon Hewitt. As well as one of the Top 30 Green Companies by Maclean's
