= Manitoba Blue Cross =

Not-for-profit insurance provider in Manitoba, Canada

United Health Services Corporation
- Trade name: Manitoba Blue Cross
- Type: Not-for-profit corporation
- Industry: Health insurance; Travel insurance
- Founded: 1974
- Headquarters: Winnipeg, Manitoba, Canada
- Key people: Benjamin Graham (president and CEO)
- Website: www2.mb.bluecross.ca

United Health Services Corporation, doing business as Manitoba Blue Cross, is a not-for-profit health benefits provider headquartered in Winnipeg, Manitoba, Canada.

== History ==
Affiliated with the Canadian Association of Blue Cross Plans, Manitoba Blue Cross was founded in 1974. Its history, however, dates back to 1938 when the Manitoba Hospital Services Association (a non-profit, hospital-sponsored association and the first organization to operate as Manitoba Blue Cross) began offering hospital benefits on a prepaid basis.

== Present ==
Manitoba Blue Cross, with its subsidiary Blue Cross Life, provides health, dental, employee assistance, life, disability and travel coverage for over half a million Manitobans. In 2018, it was named a 2018 Manitoba Top Employer by MediaCorp Canada.

== Community initiatives ==
Manitoba Blue Cross is the primary contributor of funding and administrative support for the Manitoba Medical Services Foundation (MMSF), a foundation which supports scientific research that advances and maintains the health and welfare of Manitoba residents.

Manitoba Blue Cross also supports the Children's Wish Foundation, providing free travel coverage to Manitoba children and their families any time a travel wish is granted.
