= Canadian Association of Blue Cross Plans =

Federation of not-for-profit insurance providers in Canada

- Association canadienne des Croix Bleue
- Type: Nonprofit
- Region served: Canada
- Affiliations: BCBSA, IFHP
- Website: bluecross.ca

The Canadian Association of Blue Cross Plans (CABCP; French: Association canadienne des Croix Bleue) is a federation of regional not-for-profit insurance providers in Canada. All providers that are members of CABCP, called "member plans", are independent entities which are overseen by the association to ensure consistent performance standards. The first Blue Cross Plan was offered to residents of Manitoba in 1939. The association is headquartered in Etobicoke, Ontario.

The CABCP is affiliated with the Blue Cross Blue Shield Association (which operates in the United States) and the International Federation of Health Plans.

== Member plans ==
- Alberta Blue Cross (Alberta and Northwest Territories)
- Canassurance Hospital Service Association
  - Ontario Blue Cross (Ontario) – Etobicoke (c. 1941)
  - Quebec Blue Cross (Quebec) – Montreal (c. 1942)
- Manitoba Blue Cross (Manitoba and Nunavut) – Winnipeg
- Medavie Blue Cross – Moncton, NB – New Brunswick, Nova Scotia, Prince Edward Island, Newfoundland and Labrador (c. 1943)
- Pacific Blue Cross (BC and Yukon) – Burnaby, BC
- Saskatchewan Blue Cross (Saskatchewan) – Saskatoon (c. 1946)
