= Ontario Blue Cross =

- Ontario Blue Cross Logo
- Product type: Health Insurance and Travel Insurance
- Current owner: Canassurance Hospital Service Association
- Introduced: 1941
- Markets: Ontario
- Previous owners: Ontario Hospital Association
- Website: on.bluecross.ca

Ontario Blue Cross is a registered trademark in Health Insurance. It is owned by Canassurance Hospital Service Association, a member of the Canadian Association of Blue Cross Plans.

== History ==
The Blue Cross name was introduced in Ontario in 1941 by the Ontario Hospital Association (OHA). Despite the Blue Cross plan being part of the Blue Cross movement, it remained an independent division of the OHA. The Blue Cross plan was backed by the Ontario government as a vehicle to pay for health care costs in hospitals in the province.

This plan met with immediate success resulting in 2.25 million members by 1958. With the introduction of the Ontario Hospital Insurance Plan by the Ontario government in 1959, Blue Cross had to shift its focus to offer prepayment options for semi-private care, extended health care, prescription drugs, dental care, and other benefits. These voluntary and non-profit plans covered 3.5 million Ontarians by 1970.

From 1985 to 1995, Blue Cross repositioned itself due to political changes causing large losses. This led the OHA to sell its Blue Cross assets to Liberty Mutual Insurance in March 1995. The use of the name Ontario Blue Cross, however, was not part of the sale of assets, and remained under the ownership of the Canadian Association of Blue Cross Plans (CABCP). The same year, the CABCP reopened offices in Ontario under the Ontario Blue Cross name. In May 1999, the Canassurance Hospital Service Association purchased Ontario Blue Cross.
