= Economical Insurance =

Canadian insurance company

Definity Insurance Company
- Formerly: Economical Mutual Insurance Company
- Traded as: TSX: DFY
- Industry: Insurance
- Founded: 25 November 1871
- Headquarters: Waterloo, Ontario
- Parent: Definity Financial Corporation
- Website: economical.com

The Definity Insurance Company, operating as Economical Insurance, is a Canadian insurance company that has existed since 1871. Its executive offices are located in Waterloo, Ontario, with regional offices across Canada. The company has a 4.02% market share, measured by direct written premium in the Canadian Property & Casualty Insurance market as of December 2012. As of 2014, it had about 1.6 billion in mutual policyholder's equity. It is the 9th largest property and casualty insurance company in Canada, by direct written premium and the 20th largest insurance company in Canada, by total assets.

The firm owns several operating subsidiaries, the largest of which is Economical Mutual Insurance Company. Other member companies are Perth Insurance Company, Waterloo Insurance Company, The Missisquoi Insurance Company, and Federation Insurance Company of Canada.

In May 2021, policy holders voted in favour of demutualisation. Upon the completion of this process, all shares of the company would be transferred to a new parent called the Definity Financial Corporation. Definity Financial launched its initial public offering on 9 November 2021 and closed it on 23 November. That day, Economical completed its demutualisation. On 18 December 2021, Economical changed its name to the Definity Insurance Company.

== History ==
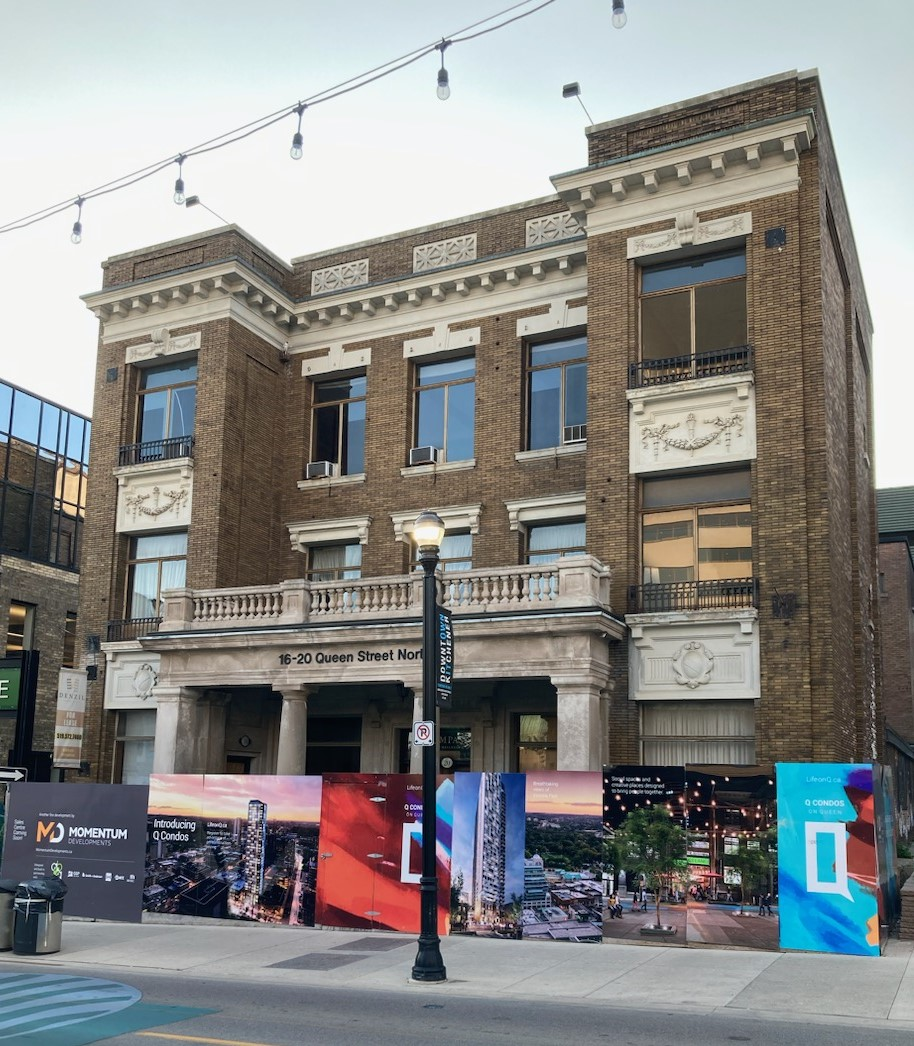
The company's 1915 headquarters at 20 Queen in Kitchener, designed by Knechtel & Schmalz. The architect was the son of general manager William Schmalz.

The company was established when a group of people in Berlin (now Kitchener), Ontario created a plan to protect themselves and their neighbours from the hardships caused by fire and lightning in 1871. On November 25, Economical Mutual Fire Insurance Company of Berlin issued its first policy on a house and barn. In 1887 the company opened its headquarters on the main street of the Berlin. One of the early directors of the company was Moses Springer, a Member of Parliament.

During World War I, the company became involved in controversy when its general manager, ex-mayor W. H. Schmaltz, opposed the renaming of the town of Berlin to Kitchener.

The company expanded over the years, both in terms of geography and type of products offered. In 1937, Economical expanded into Quebec by purchasing Merchant's Casualty Company of Waterloo. Ten years later, Economical expanded into the Maritimes through acquiring the Canadian operation of Northwestern Mutual Fire Insurance Association. Meanwhile, the company started to offer automobile, accident, and illness insurance in addition to property insurance.

In 1947, the company began plans for a new head office building to be constructed at the corner of Duke and Queen in Kitchener. At the annual meeting in February 1948, it was announced that construction would begin as soon as materials became available. However, the following year, president Euler announced that preliminary estimates had been so high that the board had to revise its initial plans. On 24 September 1949, Economical awarded the building contract to Horton Bros. Limited, and the sod was turned that month. The accounting and fire departments moved into the second floor on 12 July 1951, and the remaining departments moved in September and October of that year. On 22 February 1952, the company held an official opening and tour of the new headquarters.

Economical acquired The Missisquoi and Rouville Insurance Company of Quebec, The Perth Mutual of Stratford, Waterloo County Mutual Fire Insurance Company, the insurance-related assets of the Family Group of Companies of British Columbia, Federation Insurance, Hartford Insurance Company of Canada in 1956, 1968, 1980, 1999, 2000, and 2001 respectively. In 2006, The Mattei Companies of Seattle, Washington joined Economical Insurance, becoming the company's first subsidiary outside Canada.

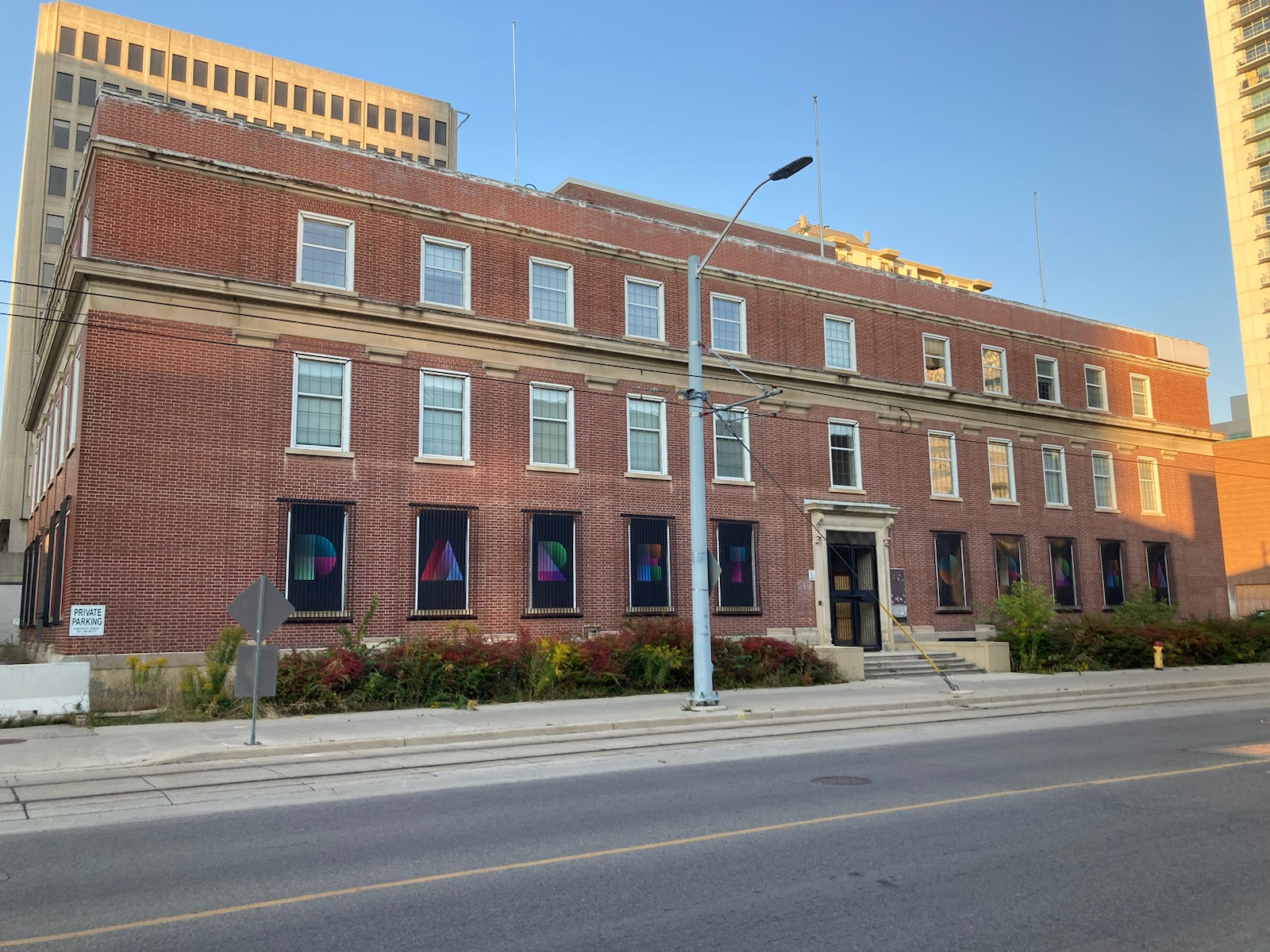
The headquarters at 10 Duke opened on 12 July 1951. It was designed by Mathers & Haldenby of Toronto. The company remained here until 1989.

Throughout these changes and additions, the company's headquarters remained in the same municipality, now the city of Kitchener-Waterloo. By 2001, Economic Insurance Group was writing over one billion dollars in premiums annually. By 2014, this had increased to $2 billion.

In December 2010, the board of Economical Mutual Insurance Company announced its intention to pursue demutualization, which would mean that some of its policy holders would become shareholders. It is the first Property & Casualty Insurance company in Canada to do this. However, as of 2014, the demutualization was temporarily on hold, pending finalization of new federal regulations governing this process. According to the Globe and Mail, the upcoming demutualization has made the company a potential target for takeover bids from other Canadian and international insurance companies.

In 2012 and 2013, Economical reduced its staff by laying off more than 280 of its employees.

The final vote to approve demutualization is slated for Spring 2021.

== Awards and recognition ==
Economical Insurance has been ranked in a Top 125 companies list in Training magazine for excellence in workforce learning and development in the year 2013.

On April 9, 2014, independent rating agency A.M. Best affirmed the financial strength and issuer credit rating of Economical Insurance as "A- (Excellent)".

== Leadership ==
=== President ===
1. Henry Fletcher Joseph Jackson, 1871–1876
2. William Oelschlager, 1876–1880
3. Hugo Kranz, 1880–1893
4. John Fennell, 1893 – 30 August 1922
5. George Charles Henry Lang, 1 September 1922 – 15 July 1936
6. Henry Knell, 1936 – 11 February 1948
7. William Daum Euler, 11 February 1948 – 15 July 1961
8. Henry Carl Krug, 15 August 1961 – 14 November 1965
9. Wilfred Walter Foot, 14 November 1965 – 1 July 1971
10. John Augustine Vila, 1 July 1971 – 9 March 1978
11. James Thomas "Sam" Hill, 9 March 1978 – 3 January 1995
12. Noel Gavin Walpole, 3 January 1995 – 15 November 2010
13. Katherine A. Mabe, 15 November 2010 – 21 June 2011
14. Karen Lynn Gavan, 21 June 2011 – 31 October 2016
15. Rowan Saunders, 1 November 2016 – 23 November 2021

=== Chairman of the Board ===
1. Henry Knell, 11 February 1948 – 10 April 1950
2. Henry Carl Krug, 14 November 1965 – 17 November 1965
3. James Kenneth Davidson Sims, December 1965 – 29 July 1970
4. Wilfred Walter Foot, 1 July 1971 – 15 March 1974
5. Walter Alexander Bean, 15 March 1974 – 11 March 1982
6. Peter Harvey Sims, 11 March 1982 – March 2005
7. Gerald Allen Hooper, March 2005 – 4 January 2016
8. John Harry Bowey, 4 January 2016 – 23 November 2021
