= La Capitale (company) =

Canadian financial services company

La Capitale Financial Group Inc.
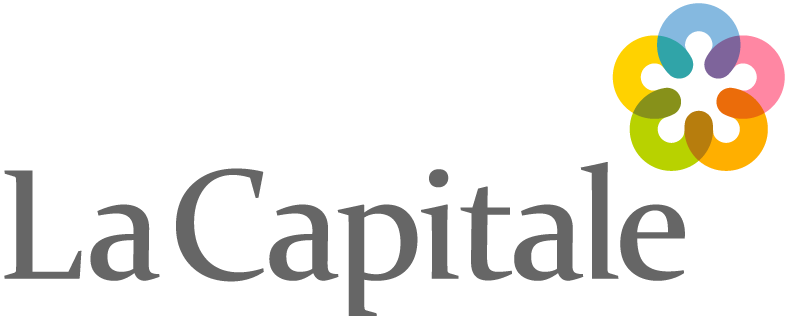
- Founded: 1940; 86 years ago
- Defunct: 2020
- Fate: Merged with SSQ Insurance
- Successor: Beneva
- Headquarters: Quebec City, Quebec, Canada
- Website: www.lacapitale.com

La Capitale Financial Group Inc. was a Canadian business that provided insurance products and financial services in Quebec, Canada. The company was headquartered in Quebec City and mainly active in Quebec, though extending its services into Ontario since 2008. With more than 900 institutions and 600,000 members of staff, La Capitale General Insurance ranked among the largest insurers in Quebec. It merged with SSQ Insurance in 2022 to become Beneva.

== History of La Capitale ==
La Capitale has it origins in a mutual fund that was formed in 1940 by state employees from Parliament Hill in Quebec who wanted to establish a more secure way to pay for their funeral expenses. The official name for this group was la Mutuelle des Employés civils. Still operating under la Mutuelle des employés civils, in 1947, the organization issued its first life insurance policies and opened its first office in Montreal, Quebec.

Initially, la Mutuelle des employés civils only offered insurance products for state employees. However, in 1954, the Quebec Liquor Commission became the first business to hold a group insurance contract with the organization.

In 1976, the first subsidiary of la Mutuelle des employés civils, La Capitale General Insurance, was formed. The creation of La Capitale General Insurance also signified the organization's move from only offering insurance products to state employees to offering their products to everyone.

=== Formation ===
Beginning with La Capitale General Insurance, the mutual company continued to form new subsidiaries, including La Capitale MFQ Real Estate Management in 1981, which is responsible for acquisitions and property management, La Capitale Insurance and Financial Services in 1989, and La Capitale Civil Service Mutual and La Capitale Civil Service Insurer in 1991, among others. In 1989, La Capitale Financial Group Inc. was formed to serve as a holding company overseeing all of La Capitale's various subsidiaries. Although a holding company, La Capitale Financial Group Inc. was still controlled by la Mutuelle des employés civils.

In 2000, La Capitale subsidiaries underwent a brand change and officially adopted the La Capitale banner.

=== Expansion of headquarters ===
From 1962 to 2013, La Capitale's head office was located in Parliament Hill in Quebec City, at the corner of Saint-Amable and De La Chevrotière. In 2013, the construction of La Capitale's new headquarters building, also located in Parliament Hill in Quebec City, was completed. The inauguration of La Capitale's new headquarters was attended by Premier Pauline Marois, the Minister of Finance and Economy, Nicolas Marceau, and Quebec City's mayor, Régis Labeaume. The La Capitale building would serve as the new head offices for La Capitale and all of its subsidiaries. As of 2013, La Capitale employs approximately 3,000 staff members at this head office in Quebec.

=== Expansion into Ontario ===
La Capitale and its various subsidiaries continued to experience growth in the early 2000s, with a significant acquisition completed in 2004, when La Capitale purchased L'Unique General Insurance for $48 million. By 2007, La Capitale had become the fourth-largest property and casualty insurer in Quebec

In 2008, La Capitale saw that it was facing a limited and in many ways saturated insurance market in Quebec. In 2009, intent on finding new revenue streams, the company initiated a project to enter the Ontario market for the first time. The company would do business in Ontario under its same La Capitale General Insurance brand name and would remain headquartered in Quebec City.

The 2009 growth project was executed in two fronts. The first part would be to develop La Capitale's business in property and casualty insurance in Ontario. The second part would be to strengthen the presence of L'Unique General Insurance in Quebec.

As part of La Capitale's move into Ontario, in 2008, La Capitale General Insurance acquired York Fire & Casualty Insurance Co., an insurance company providing automobile and property insurance in Ontario and Alberta. York Fire & Casualty was purchased from Kingsway Financial Services Inc.

Prior to this acquisition, in 2006, La Capitale Civil Service Insurer Inc. acquired Penncorp Life Insurance Co., a specialty accident and disability insurance firm located in Mississauga, Ontario. In 2005, La Capitale Financial Group acquired the AGA Financial Group, a company active outside of Quebec.

As of 2016, La Capitale has more than doubled its business done outside of Quebec.

== Company structure ==
La Capitale was organized into different divisions, each responsible for a separate line of business.

- La Capitale Civil Service Insurer: offers financial products to Quebec's public service staff.
- La Capitale General Insurance: is a subsidiary of La Capitale that has provided property and casualty insurance for over seventy years.
- La Capitale Insurance and Financial Services: is a subsidiary of La Capitale that provides group insurance products to the private and public sectors, in addition to individual products to individuals outside the public sector. La Capitale Insurance and Financial Services owned AGA Financial Group, which it sold off in 2013
- L'Unique General Insurance: is a property and casualty insurance provider that was acquired by La Capitale in 2004. As a subsidiary of La Capitale General Insurance, L'Unique General Insurance manages a network of more than 300 independent insurance brokerage firms in Quebec, Ontario, Alberta, New Brunswick, Nova Scotia and Prince Edward Island.
- La Capitale Financial Services: is a multidisciplinary financial services firm which is primarily aimed at civil service employees in Quebec.
- Unica Insurance: originally operating as York Fire & Casualty Insurance Company, the firm changed its name to Unica Insurance Incorporated in 2012. The firm was acquired by La Capitale General Insurance in 2008. As an Ontario subsidiary of La Capitale, Unica offers home and auto insurance products to individuals, as well as commercial insurance.
- La Capitale Financial Security: formerly Penncorp, this Ontario subsidiary of La Capitale specializes in individual accident and disability insurance in Canada
- La Capitale MFQ Real Estate Management: manages and develops the Quebec real estate holdings of La Capitale Civil Service Insurer.
