= The Co-operators =

Insurance company in Canada

The Co-operators Group Limited
- Type: Co-operative
- Industry: Insurance
- Founded: 1945
- Headquarters: 101 Cooper Drive; Guelph, Ontario; N1C 0A4
- Key people: Rob Wesseling, President and CEO
- Revenue: CA$3.8 billion (2016)
- Net income: CA$234.6 million (2016)
- Number of employees: 4,850 (2016)
- Website: www.cooperators.ca

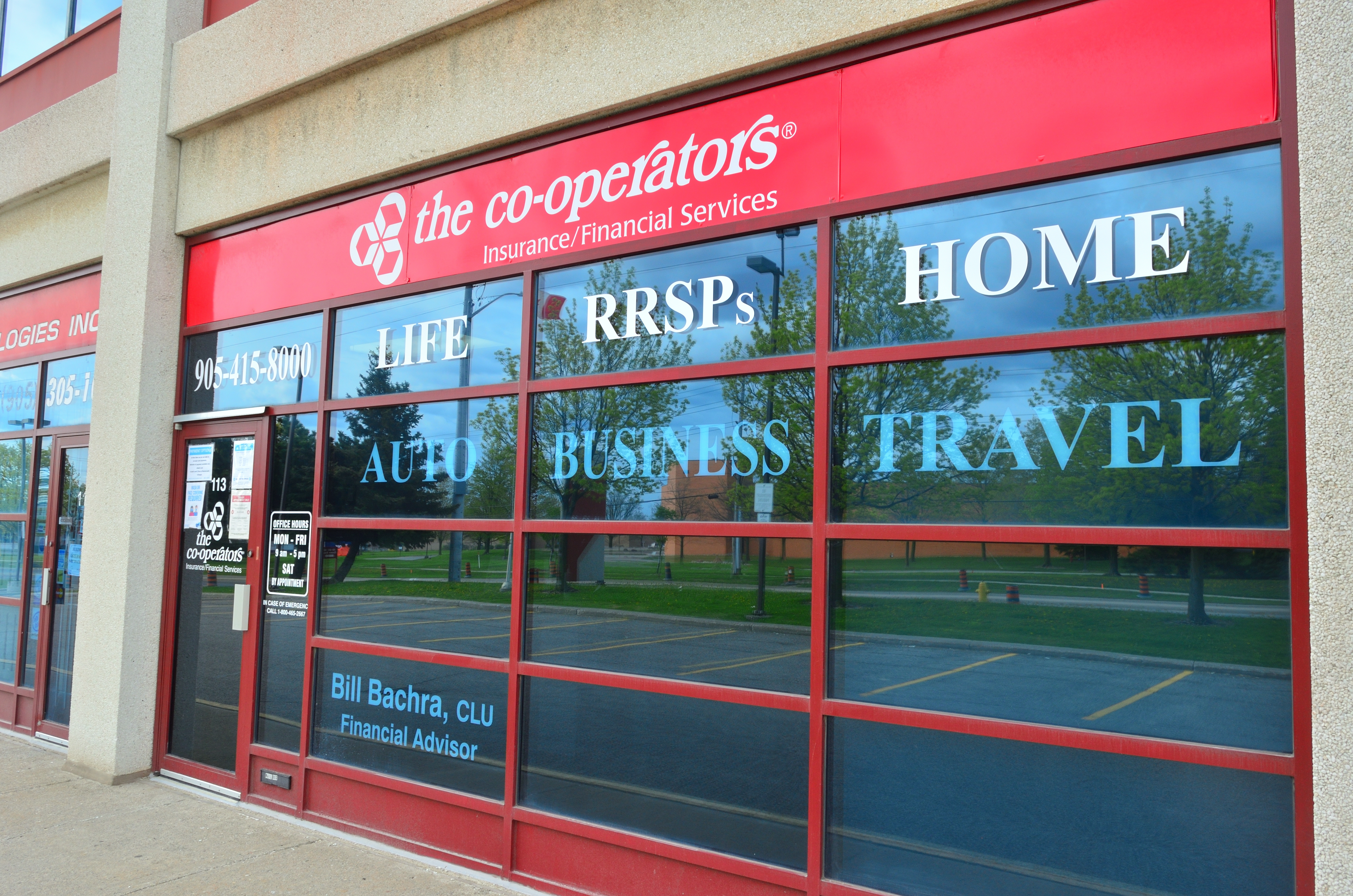
The Co-operators

The Co-operators Group Limited is a Canadian insurance co-operative, founded in 1945, owned by 46 members including co-ops, credit union centrals and representative farm organizations. It is one of the leading Canadian-owned multi-line insurers, offering auto, home, life, farm, travel and commercial insurance as well as investments. The company was started by farmers in Saskatchewan, in 1945.

The Co-operators Group Ltd. is a co-operative headquartered in Guelph, Ontario. That entity owns several operating companies, the largest of which is Co-operators General Insurance Company, which sells property and casualty insurance (i.e., auto, home, farm and commercial), primarily through its network of more than 485 exclusive agents. The second biggest company in the group is Co-operators Life Insurance Company, based in Regina, Saskatchewan, which sells life insurance (i.e., life, health, group benefits). Other member companies are HB Group Insurance of Mississauga, The Sovereign General Insurance Company of Calgary, CUMIS Group Limited based in Burlington, Ontario, and investment firm Addenda Capital of Montreal. As of year-end 2016, the group of companies had more than CA$56.4 billion in assets under administration.

== History ==
The roots of The Co-operators can be traced back to Saskatchewan. The Great Depression, followed by World War II, was a time of great adversity for rural communities as many agricultural families lost their belongings, their savings and their life insurance. In this environment, co-operatives were increasingly appealing as a way for a community to pool its resources to help rebuild lives.

A group of farmers in Saskatchewan dreamed of building a co-operative insurance company to protect their assets for future generations. In 1945, with the support of the Saskatchewan Wheat Pool and farm-based prairie co-operatives, Co-operative Life Insurance Company was incorporated in Regina.

Similar developments were underway in Ontario, where the Co-operative Union of Ontario and the Ontario Credit Union League established Co-operators Fidelity & Guarantee Association 1946 to support farmers in that province.

The Saskatchewan- and Ontario-based companies expanded significantly over the years, both in terms of geography and product offerings. The two successor companies, Regina-based Co-operative Insurance Services and Co-operators Insurance Associations of Guelph, established closer ties and, in 1975, merged as CI Management Group, which adopted the brand name "The Co-operators." In 1978, the company took its present name.

The group of companies has grown steadily since then. Presently, The Co-operators banner includes Addenda Capital, Co-operators General Insurance Company, Co-operators Life Insurance Company, The CUMIS Group, HB Group Insurance, Federated Agencies Limited, and The Sovereign General Insurance Company.

The company is currently the title sponsor for the radio network of the Canadian Football League's Saskatchewan Roughriders.

== Awards and recognition ==
Consistently ranked among the Best 50 Corporate Citizens in Canada by Corporate Knights, from 2010 to 2017, including being ranked in first place in 2011 and in the top ten in 2017.

Listed among Aon's Best Employers in Canada for 14 consecutive years, The Co-operators was one of the Platinum Winners in the 2017 report. The company has been on this list for 14 years.

Listed among Hewitt Associates' "Green 30" - a list of Canada's top employers that are highly regarded for their commitment to environmental, social and economic sustainability.
