= Beneva =

Canadian insurance company

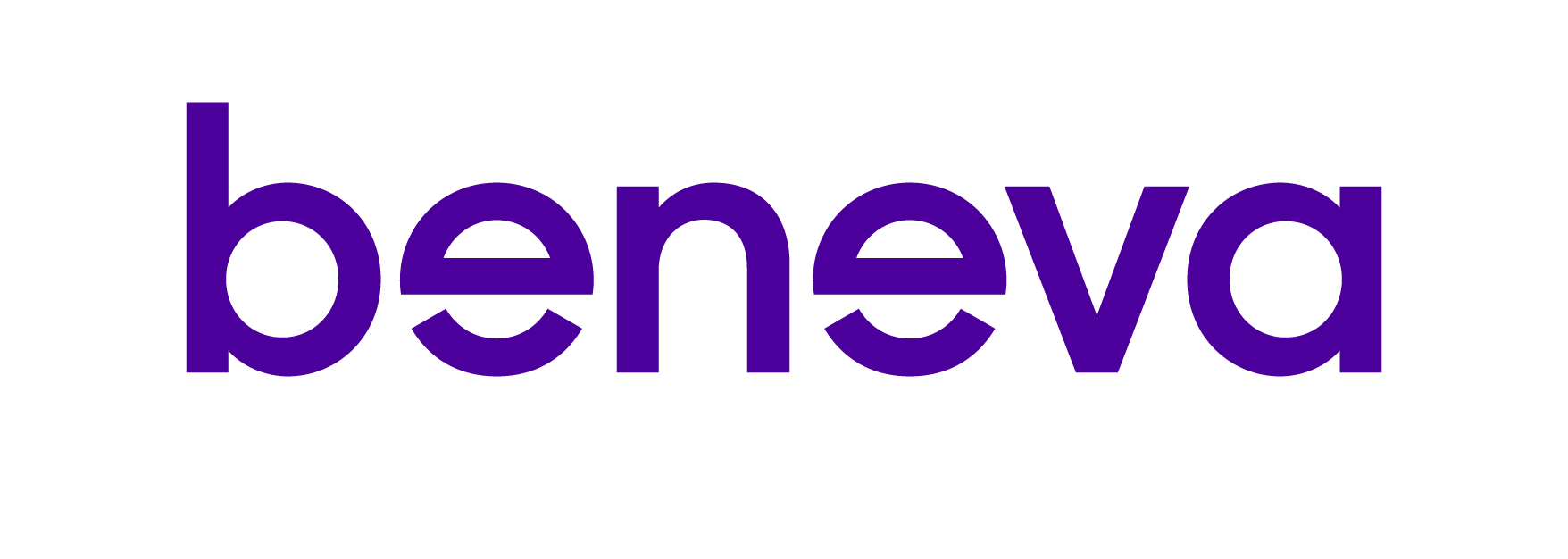
- Industry: Mutual insurance and financial services
- Predecessor: La Capitale; SSQ Insurance
- Founded: mid-2020 (established); 2022 (effective)
- Headquarters: Quebec City, Quebec, Canada
- Key people: Jean-François Chalifoux (president and CEO); Jean St-Gelais (board chair)
- Total assets: CA$25 billion (2020)
- Number of employees: 5,000+ (2020)
- Website: beneva.ca

Beneva is a Canadian mutual insurance company established in mid-2020 from the merger of La Capitale and SSQ Insurance. As of 2020, the preceding companies are in a transition period, with La Capitale transferring by 2022 and SSQ becoming Beneva in 2023.
