= Clodhopper (candy) =

Crunchy, fudge-covered graham clusters

A package of Cookies and Clods, one of the three types of Clodhoppers

Clodhoppers are crunchy, fudge-covered graham clusters. They were originally discovered and marketed by the Kraves Candy Co., located in Winnipeg, Manitoba, Canada. In 2006, the brand and recipes were sold to Brookside Foods, who were in turn sold to Hershey's in 2011.

Clodhoppers are available in vanilla & cocoa (originally named "chocolate") flavours, while dark chocolate, dark chocolate fudge, and "Cookies & Clods" flavours were sold during Kraves Candy's ownership of the product. The peanut butter flavour was the first flavour to be discontinued.

== History ==
It has been recorded that the candy and recipe were originally created by Chris Emery's grandmother, Edith Baker, as a treat for her family. Baker made the small candies from graham wafer and chocolate. In 1996, Chris Emery and his high school friend Larry Finnson decided to sell the Clodhoppers made by Emery's grandmother in their garage. In 1998, they signed a distribution contract with Wal-Mart.

The Krave's factory in Winnipeg once produced 2,500 pounds of Clodhoppers per hour. By 2006, the company's Clodhopper production plant in Winnipeg employed more than 20 employees and sold millions of the candies throughout North America.

In 2006, Krave's Candy sold its assets, which included its brands, names, recipes, customer lists, inventory and packaging equipment to Brookside Foods, based in Abbotsford, British Columbia. Krave's Candy was selling millions of dollars' worth of Clodhoppers annually across North America at the time of the sale.

In February 2012, Chris Emery and Larry Finnson, the founders of Clodhoppers formed a new start up, OMG's Candy, bringing to market a similar product, which includes diced almonds and toffee bits. In October 2012, Brookside Foods confirmed on their Facebook page that they had discontinued making Clodhoppers candy.

In 2016, The Hershey Company (who bought Brookside in 2011 after the Krave's Candy sale) brought back Clodhoppers under their own branding. The revived product is available in vanilla and cocoa flavours, and can be found at some gas station and convenience store chains, including Speedway in the northeastern United States. Hershey's later released new Clodhoppers flavours in 2017 under the Hershey's Crunchers branding, including variants based on Hershey's Cookies 'n' Creme bars, Reese's peanut butter cups, and s'mores.
