= Federated Insurance Company of Canada =

- Type: Subsidiary
- Industry: Insurance
- Founded: 1920; 106 years ago
- Headquarters: Winnipeg, Manitoba, Canada
- Key people: George Halkiotis (president)
- Products: Property & Casualty Insurance
- Number of employees: 370
- Parent: Northbridge Financial
- Website: http://www.federated.ca/

Federated Insurance Company of Canada (also known simply as Federated Insurance) is a direct writer of property and casualty insurance products headquartered in Winnipeg, Manitoba, Canada.

The company has approximately 370 employees in nine offices across Canada, with approximately 150 in Winnipeg. Federated Insurance has an A. M. Best rating of "A (Excellent)."

== History ==
During the 1890s, the retail implement dealers in Minnesota formed an association, which proved to be very successful. In 1904, these dealers decided to try to reduce their insurance costs by organizing their own insurance company.

Initially, the company was known as the Minnesota Implement Mutual Fire Insurance Company, and retained this name for many years. They would later become the Mutual Implement and Hardware Insurance Company, then Federated Mutual Implement and Hardware Insurance Company and, finally, Federated Mutual Insurance Company ("Federated Mutual").

=== In Canada ===
In September 1920, Federated Mutual began its Canadian operations. By 1933, the sales force had increased from two to 17 representatives, and the annual premium income was approximately $1 million, primarily from hardware and implement business.

Early in 1944, Federated Mutual aggressively went after and obtained endorsements from farm equipment manufacturers and associations across the country. This paved the way for writing insurance for many farm equipment dealers during the next few years.

On January 1, 1948, Federated Mutual entered the casualty insurance field, and was one of the first major insurance companies to write both fire and casualty insurance. This brought a tremendous boost to the growth and development of the Canadian operation. In November 1949, accident and health coverage was added, with group accident and health insurance being written for various trade associations and employer groups.

On January 1, 1964, Federated Mutual would bring its life insurance business, Federated Life Insurance Company ("Federated Life"), established in 1959, to Canada.

Growth continued as the company entered the group health insurance field. Group plans were sold until the provincial governments introduced socialized medicine. A supplemental health plan and dental plan was introduced in 1987.

In November 1987, the Canadian division was converted to a wholly owned corporate subsidiary operation, Federated Holdings of Canada Ltd., which holds all the stock in the two operating subsidiaries: Federated Insurance Company of Canada and Federated Life Insurance Company of Canada.

On January 1, 1990, Federated Insurance Holdings of Canada Ltd. was purchased from Federated Mutual by Fairfax Financial Holdings Ltd. of Toronto, Ontario, and Federated Insurance and Federated Life became fully Canadian-owned and operated subsidiaries of Fairfax.

In 1998, Contact+ Insurance Network Ltd. was incorporated as a wholly owned subsidiary of Federated Insurance.

The year 2000 saw Federated Insurance poised to undertake a series of major change initiatives in response to recognized external and internal drivers. Restructuring came about as result of a desire to improve proximity to and relationships with customers, and to generally, work under more efficient processes. Federated also sought to devote considerable resources to the enormous potential represented in various e-business opportunities.

In April 2003, Fairfax Financial Holdings formed Northbridge Financial Corporation to serve as the holding company for their Canadian insurance subsidiaries including, Federated Insurance, Lombard Canada Ltd, Commonwealth Insurance Company, and Markel Insurance Company of Canada. Northbridge Financial Corporation is a financial services holding company that, through its operating subsidiaries, is engaged in property and casualty insurance in Canada and in selected US and international markets. Northbridge is a wholly owned subsidiary of Fairfax Financial Holdings Ltd.

In May 2004, Federated Holdings of Canada Ltd. announced an agreement to sell Federated Life to Western Financial Group Inc. Effective February 28, 2005, the sale of Federated Life to Western Financial was complete.

== Products and services ==
Below is a list of products offered by Federated Insurance Company of Canada:

- Commercial Property and Casualty insurance
- Life, disability, and critical illness insurance
- Home and auto insurance

Markets in which Federated Insurance Company of Canada operates include:

- Automotive Dealers
- Automotive Repair Garages
- Commercial Property
- Equipment Dealers
- Electrical Contractors
- Fuel Dealers
- Grocery Stores
- Home-Builders
- Manufacturers
- Mechanical Contractors
- Motorcycle and Powersports Dealers
- Petroleum Dealers
- Printers
- Professional & Health Services
- Restaurants
- RV Dealers
- Tire Dealers
- Trade Contractors
