= Travel insurance =

Insurance that covers financial losses from events during travel

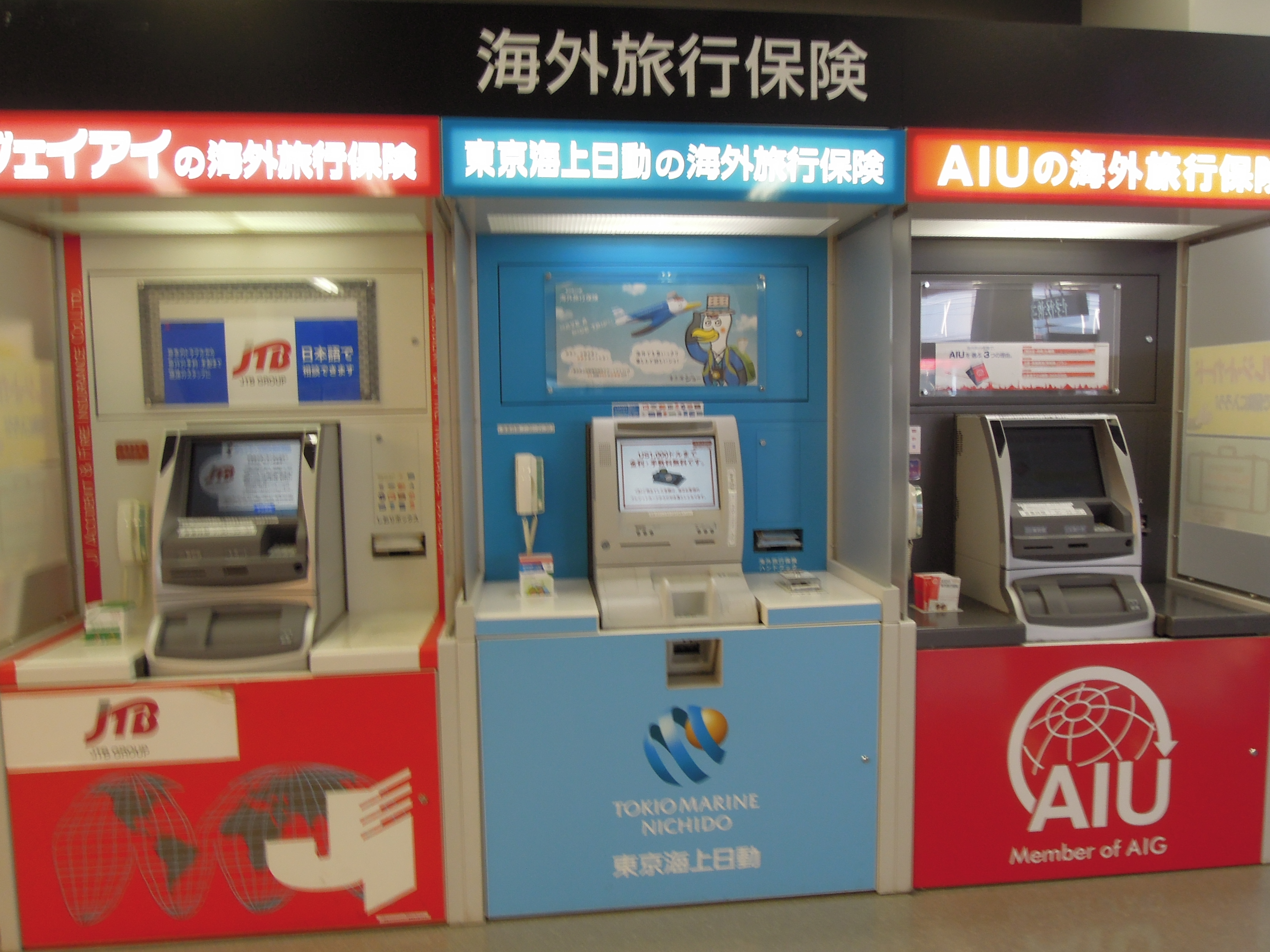
Travel insurance vending machines in Japan

Travel insurance is an insurance product for covering unexpected losses incurred while travelling, either internationally or domestically. Basic policies generally only cover emergency medical expenses while overseas, while comprehensive policies typically include coverage for trip cancellation, lost luggage, flight delays, public liability, and other expenses.

The United States Travel Insurance market valued at over $4B, protecting around 77 million people through around 49 million plans in 2022, according to the United States Travel Insurance Association.

Updated statistics indicate that U.S. travelers spent $5.56 billion on travel insurance in 2024, according to the 2022–2024 Travel Protection Market Study from the U.S. Travel Insurance Association (USTIA). In 2024, 86.97 million people were protected by 54.87 million plans provided by USTIA members.

== Policy purchase ==
=== Cost calculation ===
Travel insurance, are risk-based, and take into account a range of factors to determine whether a traveler can purchase a policy and what the premium will be. This generally includes destination countries or regions, the duration of the trip, the age of the travelers, and any optional benefits that they require coverage for such as pre-existing medical conditions, adventure sports, rental vehicle excess, cruising, or high-value electronics. Some policies will also take into account the traveler's estimated value of their trip to determine price. A policy may be a single trip, covering the exact duration of the upcoming trip, or a "multi-trip" policy can cover an unlimited number of trips of limited duration within a year.

=== Journey departure and return conditions ===
Most travel insurance policies must be purchased prior to departure from home, or from the first departure point (e.g. an airport), depending on the product. A smaller number of brands offer travel insurance for travelers who are already overseas and have forgotten to purchase travel insurance or have a policy that has expired. Most policies require ones to start and finish one's journey in one's country of residence. However, some policies offer coverage for one-way travel for people who are permanently relocating to another country.

=== Complimentary travel insurance ===
Some credit card issuers offer automatic travel insurance if travel arrangements are paid for using their credit cards, but these policies are generic and do not take into account personal requirements and circumstances. This coverage can include benefits such as trip cancellation, lost luggage, and emergency medical assistance, adding a layer of protection for travellers at no additional cost. However, as these policies are often generic they may not be tailored to meet individual travel needs or specific circumstances.

== Common benefits ==
=== Medical ===
In the event of minor injury or illness overseas, medical benefits offer coverage for visits to general practitioners, medicine, ambulance fees, and limited dentistry benefits. In the event of hospitalisation, most travel insurance policies include emergency assistance services, which can offer guarantees of payment to hospitals for treatment, liaise treating doctors, and organise transfers between hospitals or medical evacuations back to the insured person's country of origin. More comprehensive policies include an emergency companion cover, so that a family member can remain with the insured person while in hospital.

In the event of death overseas, medical benefit sections typically include cover for repatriation of remains to the insured person's country of origin, or a funeral overseas.

=== Cancellation ===
Comprehensive travel insurance policies include cover for any cancellation fees or lost deposits relating to cancellation of the insured's person's trip for a range of unforeseen and unexpected circumstances. These include illness or injury, natural disasters and bad weather, strikes and riots, hijacking, and family emergencies. Depending on the policy, it may also include cancellation due to jury service, being made redundant from full-time employment, having annual leave revoked for those in the armed forces or emergency services, and prohibition of or advisory against travel by a government to a particular destination.

=== Alternative transport and travel expenses ===
Many policies include benefits for alternative transport, accommodation, and meal expenses if the transport provider is delayed by a certain period, provided any layover times met the criteria in the policy. Policies may also include a benefit to purchase essential items like clothing and toiletries in the event baggage is delayed by an airline.

=== Luggage ===
Luggage benefits cover for loss, damage or theft of personal effects during one's journey, including passports and other travel documents. It may also include limited benefits for theft of cash.

=== Public liability ===
This covers legal liability as a result of a claim made against the covered party for bodily injuries or damage to property of other persons.

== Optional benefits ==
In addition to their base policies, many providers offer coverage for declared pre-existing conditions (e.g. asthma, diabetes, cancer), higher risk sports and activities (e.g. skiing, trekking at high altitudes, scuba diving), rental car damage, and cruising.

== Common exclusions ==
Insurance companies issuing will often exclude coverage for ongoing known events to new policies, and may announce long-term exclusions for specific events, such as volcanic activity from a currently active volcano. As travel insurance is a risk-based product, many policies will exclude events which may be of a far-reaching and poorly quantified risk, such as pandemics and endemics, acts of war, and terrorism. Some policies exclude travel to certain countries, or parts of countries, where a greater risk is expected. These determinations are often made based on official government travel advice from organisations such as the US State Department or the Australian Department of Foreign Affairs.

Other common exclusions in travel insurance policies include:

- Undeclared pre-existing medical conditions
- Unlicensed operation of a motorcycle
- Travelling for the purpose of receiving medical treatment
- Elective surgery or treatment
- Injury or illness caused by reckless activity such as careless driving, use of alcohol, use of recreational drugs
- Leaving belongings unattended
- Participating in high risk sports and activities (such as scuba diving, extreme sports)
- Travelling against government advice and recommendations

== Compulsory travel insurance ==
Certain countries require foreign visitors have proof of sufficient travel insurance as a condition for granting a visa or of approving visa-free entry. This includes travelers heading to several countries. In some cases, travel insurance is required simply for entry into a country. In other cases, it is required as part of a visa application, such as for a UAE visa or Schengen visa. When travel insurance is mandatory, there is often a set of criteria that the policy must meet. Policy requirements are typically set by governing bodies, such as the European Union, in the case of Schengen visa applications. Cuba, Turkey and Belarus. Thailand and Egypt have announced plans to introduce similar requirements. Tour companies and cruise providers may also require passengers possess a minimum level of travel insurance before the traveller can commence their journey.

== See also ==
- Visitor health insurance
