= The Personal =

Insurance Company

The Personal Insurance Company
- Trade name: The Personal
- Native name: La Personnelle, compagnie d'assurances
- Type: Subsidiary
- Industry: Insurance
- Founded: 1974; 52 years ago
- Headquarters: Lévis, Quebec, Canada
- Area served: Most of Canada
- Services: Car insurance; Home insurance; Travel insurance; Pet insurance
- Owner: Desjardins Group
- Parent: Desjardins General Insurance
- Website: thepersonal.com

The Personal Insurance Company, operating as The Personal (French: La Personelle), is a Canadian insurance company which specializes in group insurance, primarily home insurance and vehicle insurance. The Personal is a subsidiary of Desjardins General Insurance, the third largest P&C insurer in Canada.

== History ==
The Personal was the first insurer in Canada to provide auto and home group insurance, the concept was originally common only for group life insurance. Auto and home were the only products offered initially. Later, The Personal broadened their range of services to include other products, such as recreational vehicles, travel and pets.

On May 2, 1986, The Personal (then called The Security), reached an agreement with the Centrale de l'enseignement du Québec (CEQ), who was looking for group insurance. This agreement signaled the official start of group P&C insurance in Quebec.

In 2004, Desjardins Group did a major restructuring of The Personal to unify its activities all around Canada. They wanted to use the same technology, same principles and same management throughout their subsidiaries to become a true pan-Canadian company.

In 2013, alongside Desjardins General Insurance, The Personal launched Ajusto, which was one of the first "widely available UBI offerings to be approved by the Financial Services Commission of Ontario (FSCO)". Usage based insurance was already used in some countries (United States, United Kingdom and Europe) before telematics technology got to Canada with the help of iMetrik Solutions.

== Group insurance ==
The sector of group insurance in Canada became more and more popular in the 1980s and 1990s, creating more competition that led to better coverage: with more choices, the prices got more stable and the service improved. However, it also led to what was called “synthetic groups”, that were not considered as real groups sharing the same situation (risk profile, affinity, homogeneous characteristics). The rules to be considered as a group are not the same in every province of Canada, and in Quebec, the lack of regulation created a "free market model". In reaction, The Personal created their own specific guidelines for their partners.

== Services ==
The Personal offers group insurance products to insure cars, homes, recreational vehicles and pets, and also includes identity theft assistance. They offer their services through agents, their company website, and recently through their mobile app (used as a control center for all the mobile programs). Their two principal mobile features are Ajusto and Alert.

== Prices and distinctions ==
According to a J.D. Power study about customer satisfaction with home insurance, The Personal ranked first in Quebec in 2015. The same study in 2018 for the auto insurance sector also ranked the company as first in Canada.

== Privacy rights criticism ==
In 2013, some concerns were raised about the new technology Intelauto and Ajusto that could be used to "spy" on customers. Privacy Commissioner Dr. Ann Cavoukian tried to put a hold on these fears, since the program is on a voluntary basis and the contract clearly stipulates the terms, which means the users stay in control of their information. However, not all concerns were waived : John Lawford, executive director and general counsel with the Public Interest Advocacy Centre (PIAC) in Ottawa, raised a point that even if these information are strictly for the user, they still could be disclosed to third parties in some situations like civil cases, where it could be dig out by law enforcement.

In 2017, The Personal faced accusation of citizen's privacy rights. They were accused by the federal Privacy Commissioner of accessing credit rating without proper reasons. The Personal defended themselves by saying that they accessed such information only to rule out fraudulent claims, but advocate Rhona DesRoches suggested that "companies want instead to gauge the claimant’s financial status to help determine how little they can get away with paying out".

== See also ==
- Desjardins
- Desjardins General Insurance
- List of Canadian insurance companies
