= SACE (company) =

Italian export credit agency

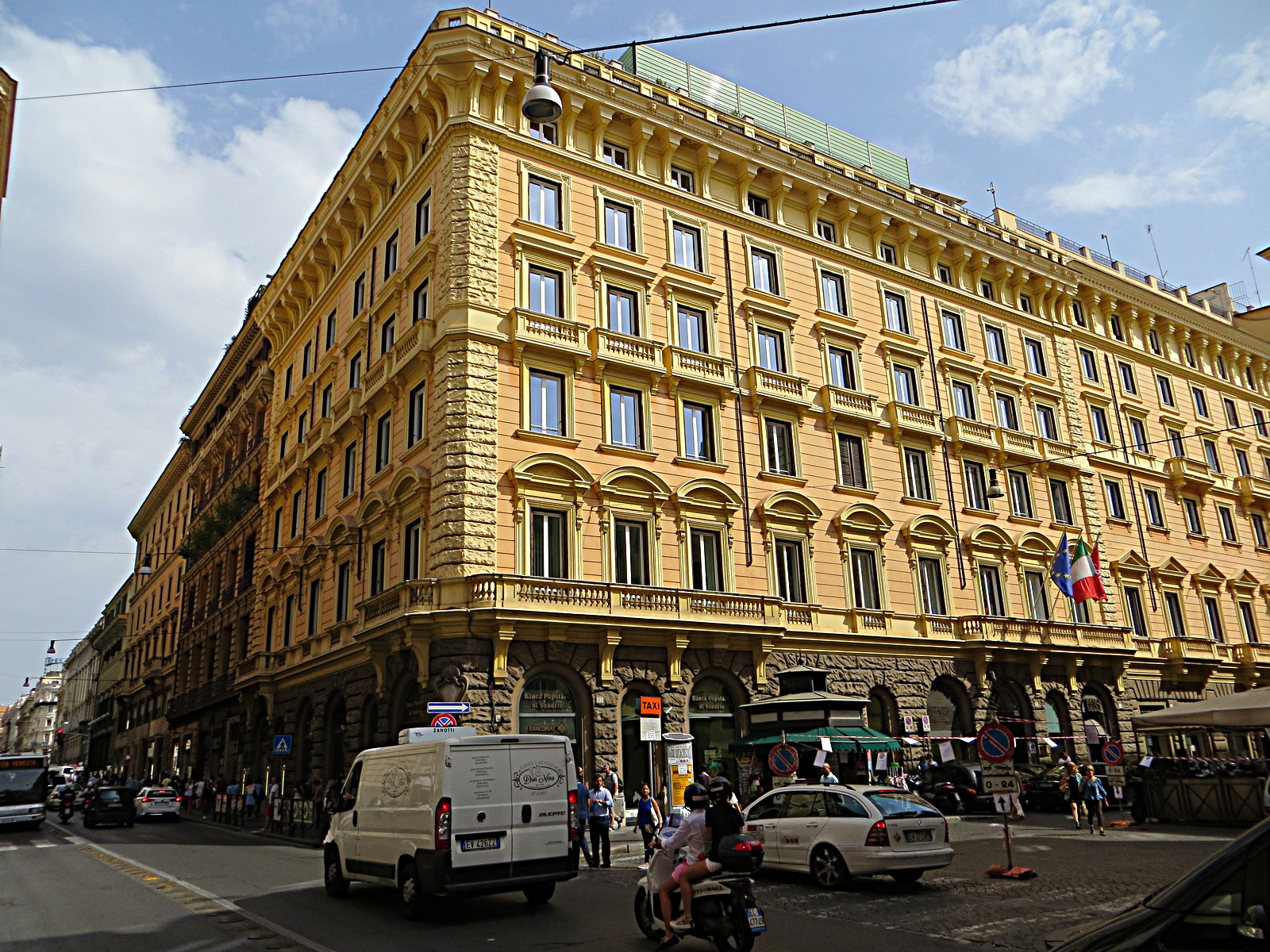
- SACE Headquarters
- Native name: SACE S.p.A.
- Type: Società per azioni
- Industry: Insurance industry
- Founded: 1977 (SACE); 2017 (SACE SIMEST); 2022 (SACE)
- Founder: Government of Italy
- Headquarters: Rome, Italy
- Area served: Italy
- Key people: Michele Pignotti (CEO); Guglielmo Picchi (Chairman)
- Products: Financial services
- Owner: Italian Ministry of Economy and Finance (MEF) (100%)
- Number of employees: 817 (2025)
- Parent: Ministry of Economy and Finance
- Website: www.sace.it

SACE is Italy's Export credit agency, wholly-owned by the Italian Ministry of Economy and Finance (MEF), specialized in supporting Italian companies through a wide range of instruments and solutions to foster exports and innovation, including financial guarantees, factoring, risk management and protection, advisory services, and business matching initiatives.

SACE has 23 offices worldwide, and supports 60,000 companies. They have a portfolio of insured transactions and guaranteed investments of approximately €270 billion across 200 markets.

== History ==
- 1977 - establishment of Sezione speciale per l'Assicurazione del Credito all'Esportazione - SACE as public entity under the surveillance of the Italian Ministry of the Treasury
- 1990 - establishment of Società Italiana per le Imprese Miste all'Estero - SIMEST as public entity under the surveillance of the Italian Ministry of Foreign Trade
- 1998 - Sezione speciale per l'Assicurazione del Credito all'Esportazione - SACE was transformed into Istituto per i Servizi Assicurativi del Commercio Estero - SACE as an entity with legal personality under public law, under the supervision of the Ministry of the Treasury, Budget and Economic Planning
- 2004 - SACE is transformed into a joint-stock company, whose capital is wholly-owned by Ministry of Economy and Finance and enters the short-term credit insurance market
- 2005 - SACE enters the surety market
- 2010 - SACE enters the factoring market
- 2012 - SACE is acquired by Cassa Depositi e Prestiti
- 2016 - SACE and SIMEST constitute a hub for exports and internationalization with their One-door initiative
- 2017 - establishment of SACE SIMEST
- 2022 - In March 2022, the "SACE Decree" (Decree Law n. 23/2020) defined the reorganization of the SACE Group, under which SACE transferred its stake in SIMEST to Cassa Depositi e Prestiti and the latter transferred its 100% stake in SACE to the Ministry of Economy and Finance.

== Activity ==
SACE, 100% controlled by the Italian Ministry of Economy and Finance (MEF), offers a complex range of instruments for credit insurance, investment protection, the provision of sureties and financial guarantees. The credit insurance is the reduction or transfer to third parties of the risks of insolvency. The insurance includes, from an economic-financial, managing and funding the loan. The risks of construction are all factors capable of damaging a particular company or that she herself may be damaged.

== Share ownership ==
- SACE holds 100% of the shares of SACE BT S.p.A. and of SACE Fct S.p.A.
- SACE BT S.p.A. in turn holds 100% of the capital of SACE SRV s.r.l.

== See also ==
- Cassa Depositi e Prestiti
