= Desjardins Financial Security =

Canadian life and health insurance company

- Type: Private
- Industry: Insurance
- Founded: 1948; 78 years ago in Montreal, Quebec
- Founder: Laurent Létourneau
- Headquarters: Lévis, Quebec, Canada
- Area served: Canada
- Key people: Denis Dubois (president)
- Services: Life insurance; Health insurance; Retirement insurance; Business insurance
- Net income: $763 million (2019)
- Total assets: $127.9 billion (2019)
- Number of employees: 4,946 employee, 6,157 brokers (December 31, 2019)
- Parent: Desjardins Financial Corporation inc.
- Website: desjardinslifeinsurance.com

Desjardins Financial Security (DFS) is the life and health insurance arm of Desjardins Group, the leading financial institution in Quebec and the largest cooperative financial group in Canada. DFS registered a record-breaking revenue data in 2016, with a year-over-year increase of 12.5%. In terms of written premium, the industry ranks second in Quebec, and fifth in Canada.

The head office of Desjardins Financial Security is in Lévis, Quebec, and has branches in several cities across Canada, including Vancouver, Calgary, Winnipeg, Toronto, Ottawa, Montreal, Quebec City, Halifax and St. John's. They represent more than 5 million Canadians and administer over 100 billions in assets.

In 2018, they are targeting four new acquisition sectors: P&C insurance, wealth management, payment world and fintech/insurtech.

== About ==
The company offers insurance for individual, groups or businesses, and also savings for individual or group retirement savings. They were the first ones in Quebec to offer what they call in French caissassurance (union credit assurance), a service where customers can meet a financial security advisor at any caisse populaire who can offer them insurance products (possible since the Act Respecting the Distribution of Financial Products and Services).

Their main insurance products include life insurance (term life, permanent life and universal life), health insurance (critical illness and disability insurance), and loan and credit insurance.

== History ==
In 1948, Desjardins Financial Security was created under the name of "Desjardins Life Insurance". The initial purpose was to provide resources to families to help them achieve better financial health, so they created programs like family insurance and credit insurance.

In 1962, they became the largest life insurance company in Quebec with the acquisition of La Sauvegarde.

In 2002, after many acquisitions, Desjardins Life Insurance was rebranded as Desjardins Financial Security. In 2009, following an organizational restructuring, their operations and corporative functions were incorporated by Desjardins Group, who wanted to reinforce the cohesion and the efficacy of its company and subsidiaries.

In 2014, Desjardins Group bought State Farm, an American insurance firm, and boosted their life insurance business with this transaction. It doubled the volume of life insurance premiums and Desjardins Financial Security became the fourth-largest life and health insurer in Canada.

Acquisitions over time:

1948: Desjardins Life Assurance was founded

1952: First pension and group insurance plans were established for Desjardins Group employees

1953: Family Insurance was created

1954: Savings-Life Insurance and Loan Insurance were launched

1955: First group insurance plans outside the caisse network were established

1958: Accident Insurance for School Children (renamed Accirance in 1968) was launched

1962: La Sauvegarde was acquired

1978: Assurance populaire Desjardins was launched

1989: Laurier Life Insurance was acquired

1990: Desjardins Life Assurance and La Sauvegarde merged

1992: Individual, group and accident insurance portfolios acquired from Les Coopérants

1994: Life and health insurance portfolio of the Laurentian Group and its subsidiary Imperial Life was acquired

1994: Desjardins Life Assurance became Desjardins-Laurentian Life Assurance

1995: Æterna-Life Insurance Company was acquired

2000: Desjardins-Laurentian Life Assurance and the Laurentian Life and Health Insurance Corporation merged

2001: Desjardins-Laurentian Life Assurance and Imperial Life merged

2002: Desjardins Financial Security was created

2006: Performa Financial Group was acquired

2007: Desjardins Financial Security Investments Inc. (brokerage subsidiary) was created

2009: Desjardins Group announced a restructuring and integration

2014: Desjardins Group announced the acquisition of State Farm Canada

2019: State Farm is now officially rebranded under the Desjardins brand

== See also ==
- Life insurance
- Lévis
- Desjardins Group
- Desjardins Insurance
- Desjardins General Insurance
