= Eva (coopérative) =

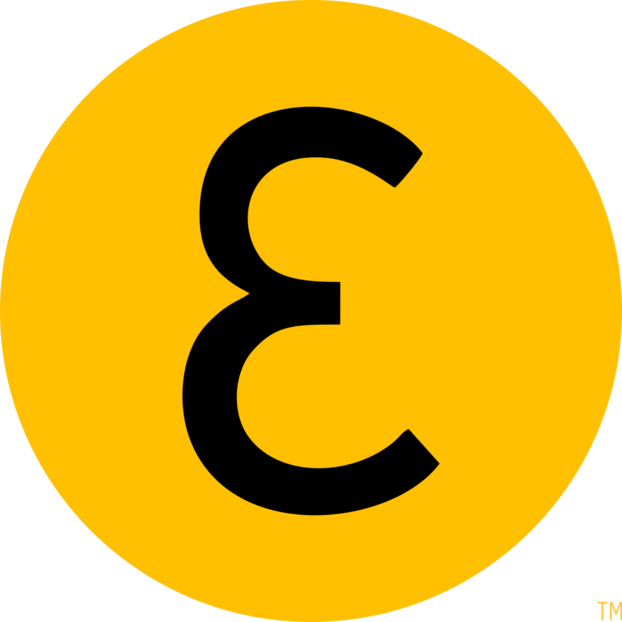
Eva logo

Eva is a cooperative ridesharing and delivery application based on blockchain technology. The application connects passenger members to driver members in a peer-to-peer approach. The organization was founded in 2017 and the application was launched in Montreal on May 13, 2019. The head office is based in Montreal, Canada.

== History ==
The idea to develop a cooperative ridesharing company based on a blockchain model came from Raphaël Gaudreault and Dardan Isufi, who then founded Eva in December 2017 in partnership with Desjardins Group.

On January 11, 2019, the Government of Quebec officially authorized Eva, through the same pilot project as Uber, to launch in Montreal, Quebec City, and Gatineau. It is the second ridesharing application to be regulated even before Lyft was. First launched in Montreal on May 13, 2019, the application is also available from Montreal International Airport.

In May 2020, due to the COVID-19 pandemic, Eva developed a delivery service within its application. From that year on, the company was no longer solely specialized in passenger transportation.
