= 2020 G20 Riyadh summit =

Summit of the leaders of all G20 member nations in Riyadh, Saudi Arabia

2020 G20 Riyadh summit 15th G20 Summit
- 21–23 November 2020
- Host country: Saudi Arabia
- Motto: Realizing Opportunities of the 21st Century For All
- Cities: Buraidah, Riyadh, & Tabuk, as well as various locations virtually
- Participants: G20 members Invitees: Bangladesh, Comoros, Egypt, Mauritius, Pakistan, Senegal, Portugal, Spain, & United Arab Emirates
- Chair: King Salman; Prince Mohammed bin Salman; House of Saud

The 2020 G20 Riyadh summit was the fifteenth meeting of the Group of Twenty (G20). It was scheduled to take place in Riyadh, the capital city of Saudi Arabia. However, due to the COVID-19 pandemic, it was held virtually.

== Participating leaders ==
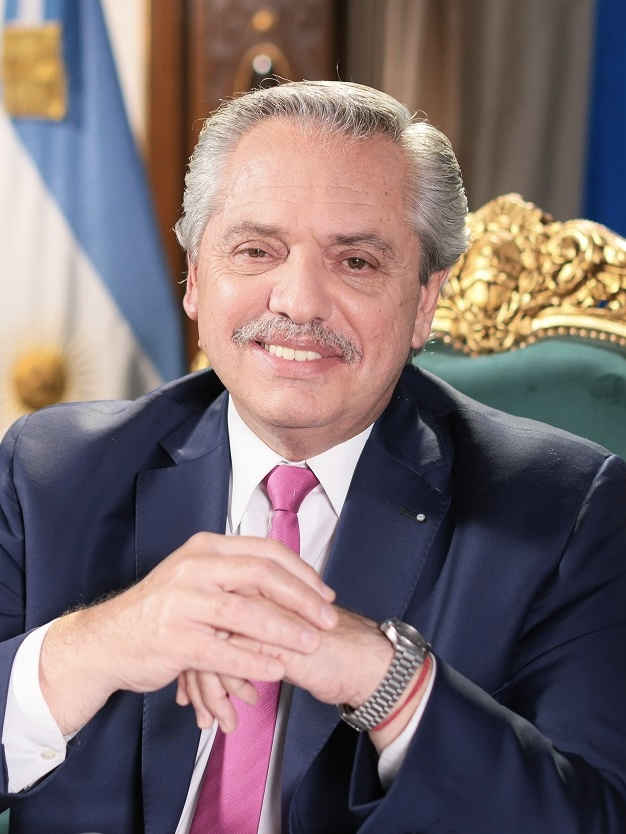
Argentina
Alberto Fernández, President

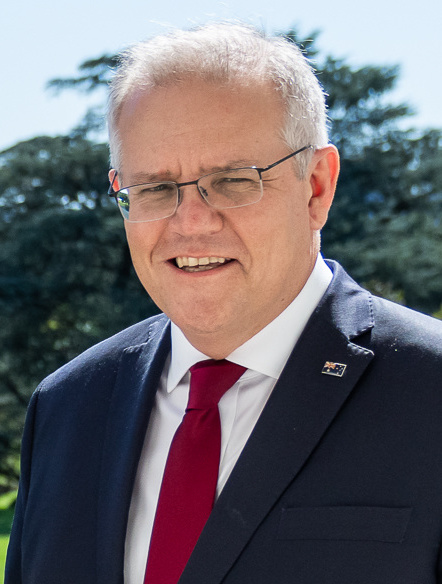
Australia
Scott Morrison, Prime Minister

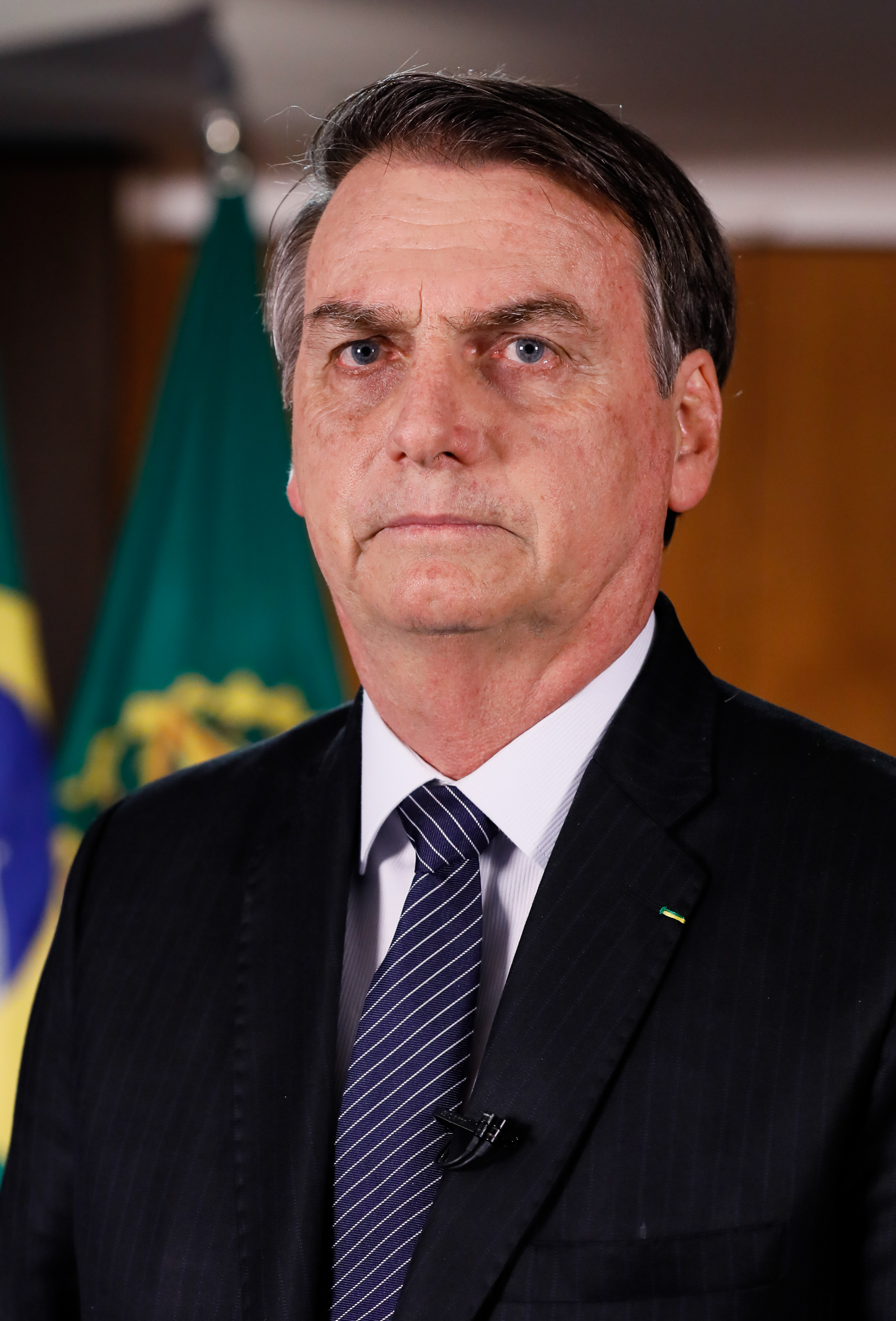
Brazil
Jair Bolsonaro, President

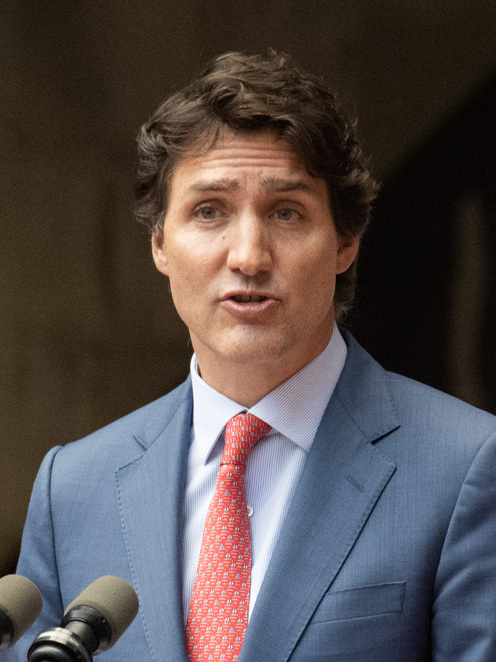
(Canada) Canada
Justin Trudeau,
Prime Minister

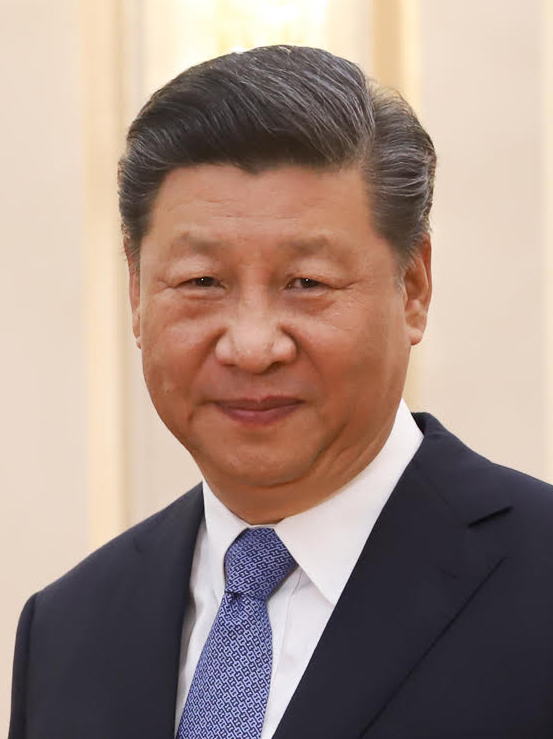
China
Xi Jinping, CCP General Secretary and President (Note: The president of China is legally a ceremonial office, but the general secretary of the Chinese Communist Party (de facto top leader in a one-party communist state) has always held this office since 1993 except for the months of transition, and then-CCP general secretary is Xi Jinping, who is also the Chinese president.)

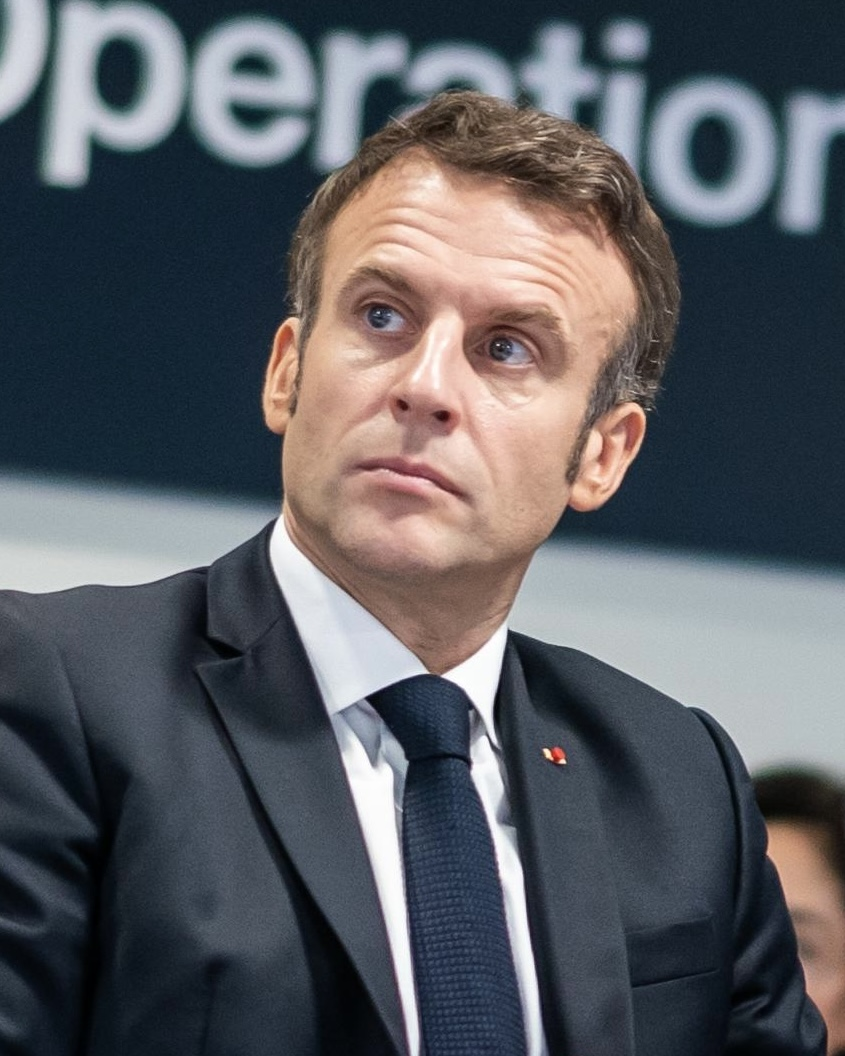
France
Emmanuel Macron, President

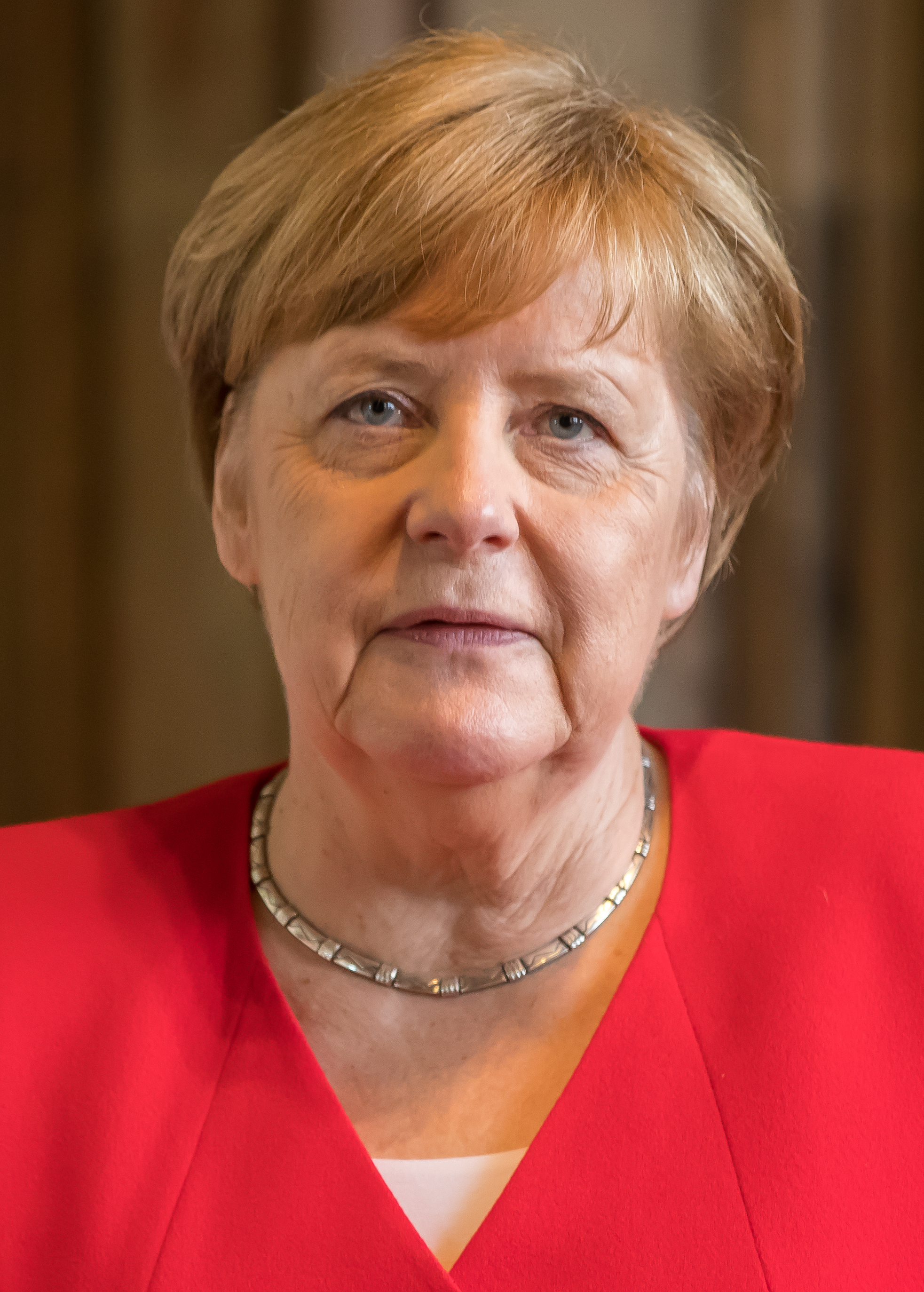
Germany
Angela Merkel, Chancellor

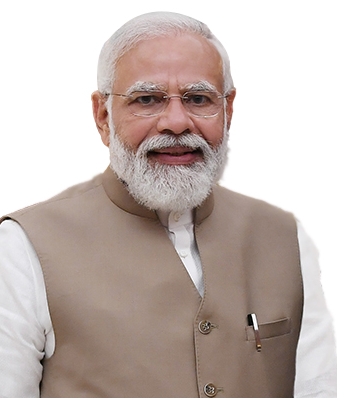
India
Narendra Modi, Prime Minister

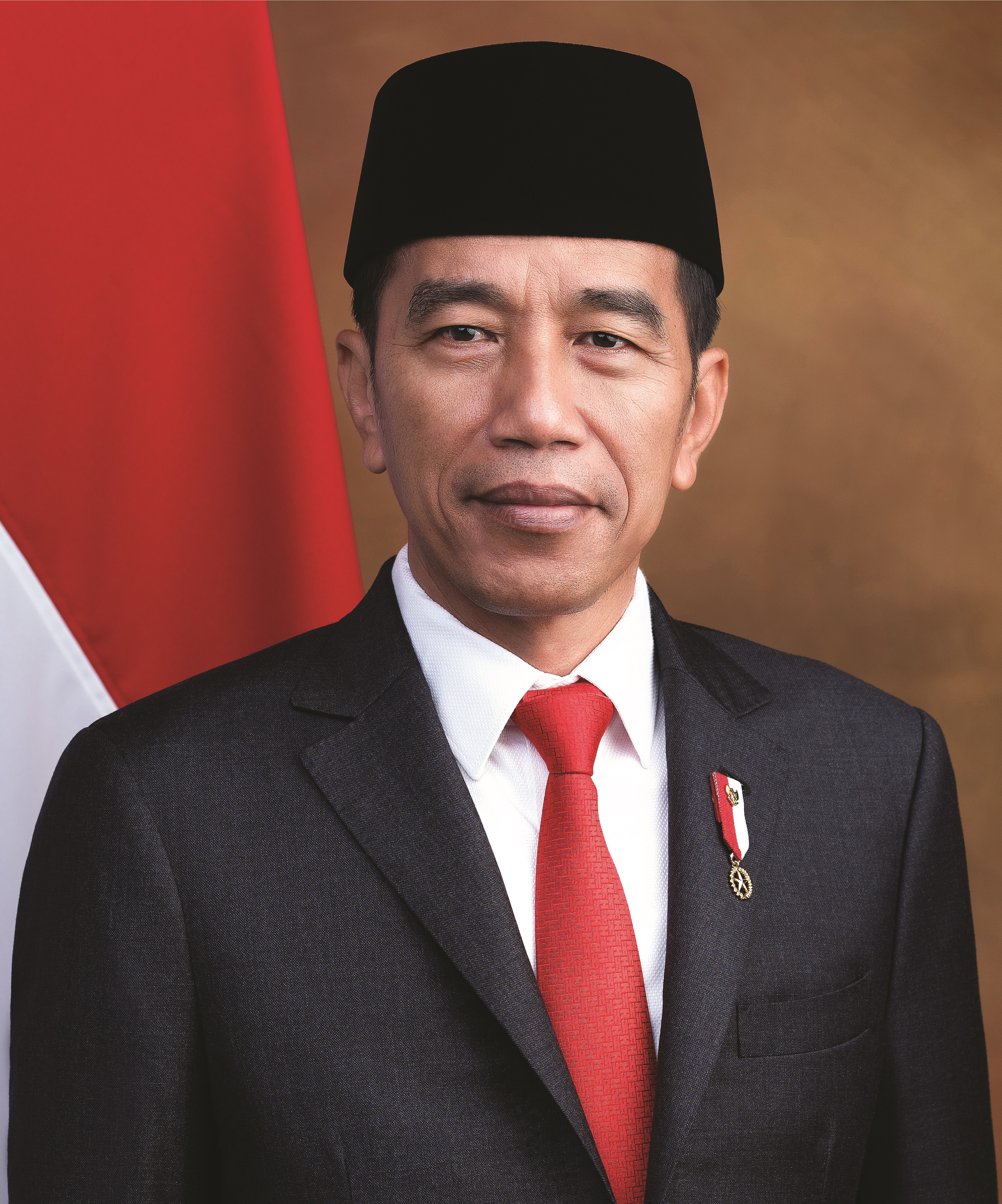
Indonesia
Joko Widodo, President

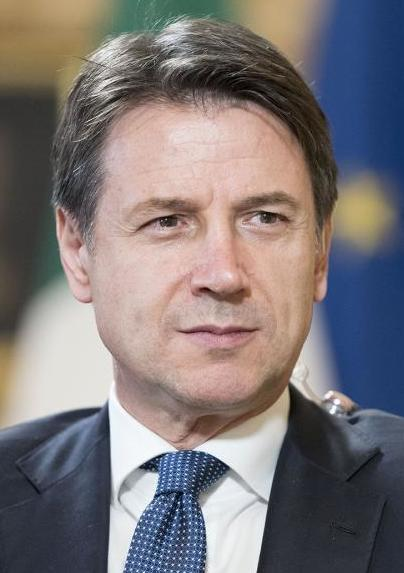
Italy
Giuseppe Conte, Prime Minister

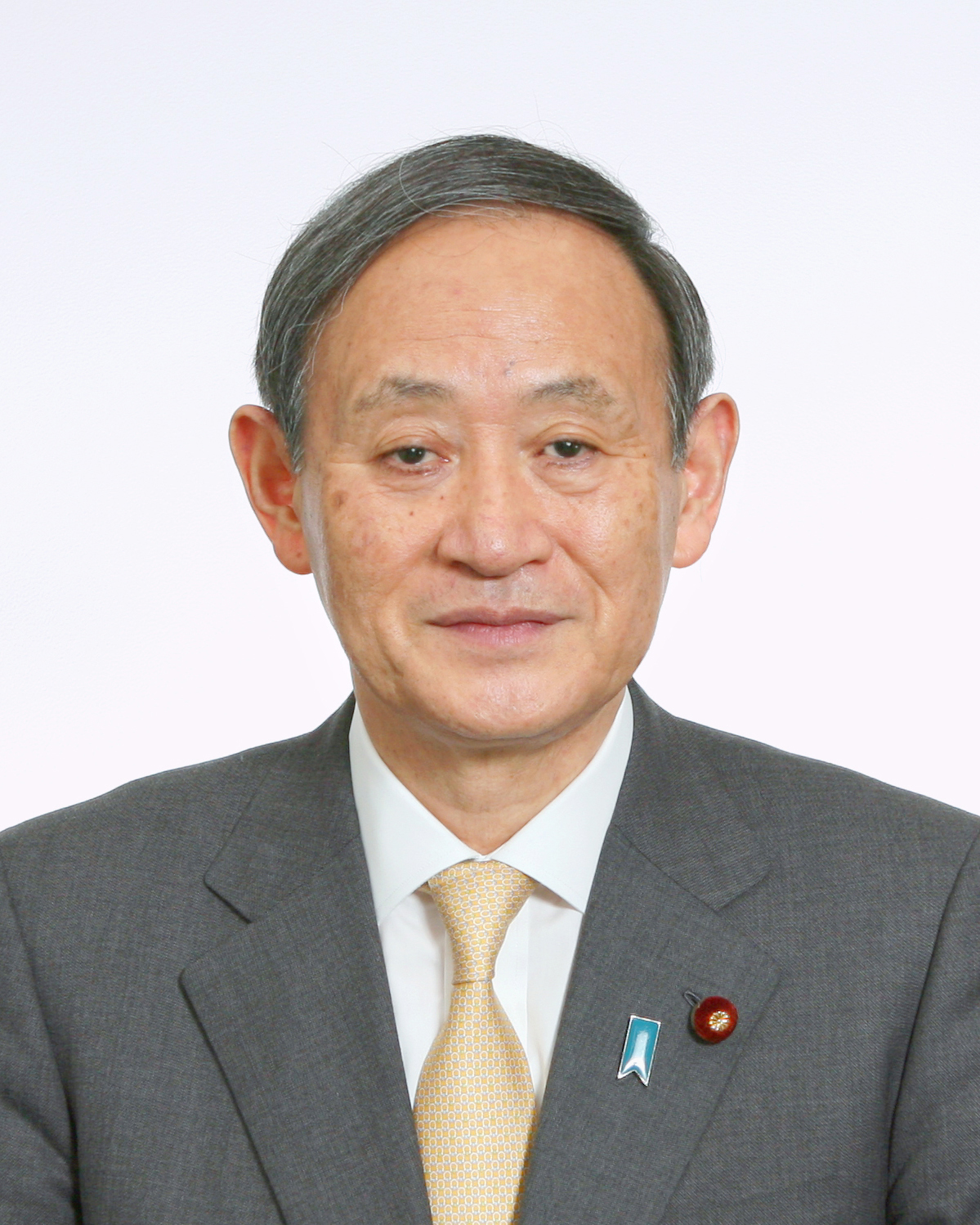
Japan
Yoshihide Suga, Prime Minister

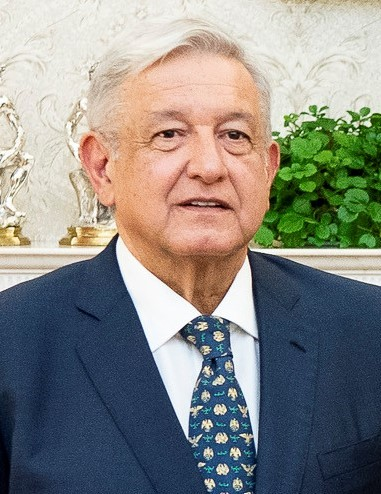
Mexico
Andrés Manuel López Obrador, President

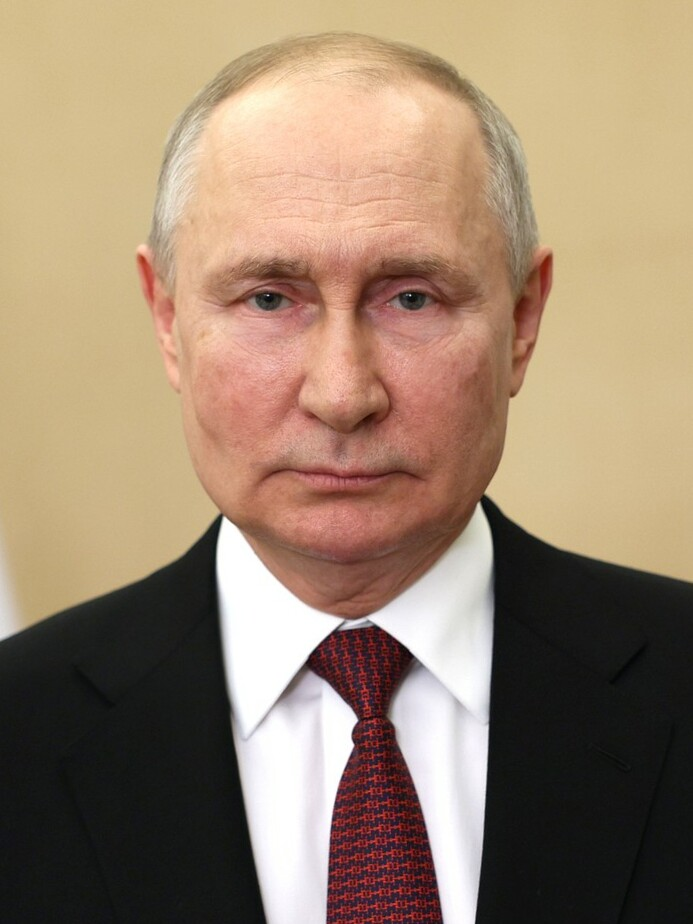
Russia
Vladimir Putin, President

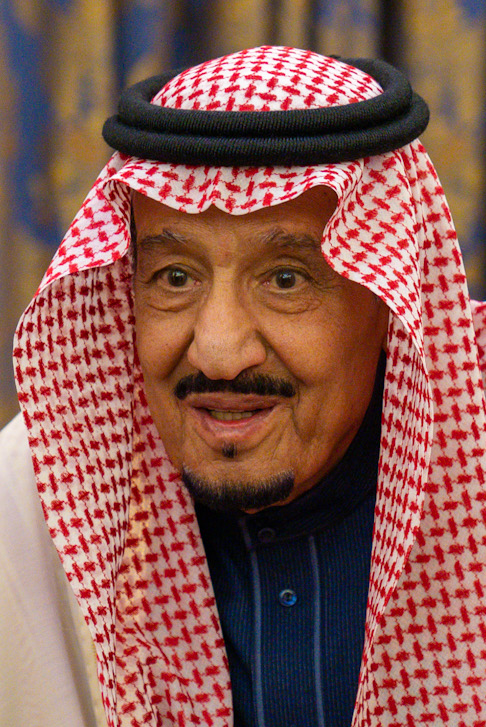
Saudi Arabia
Salman bin Abdulaziz Al Saud, King
(host)

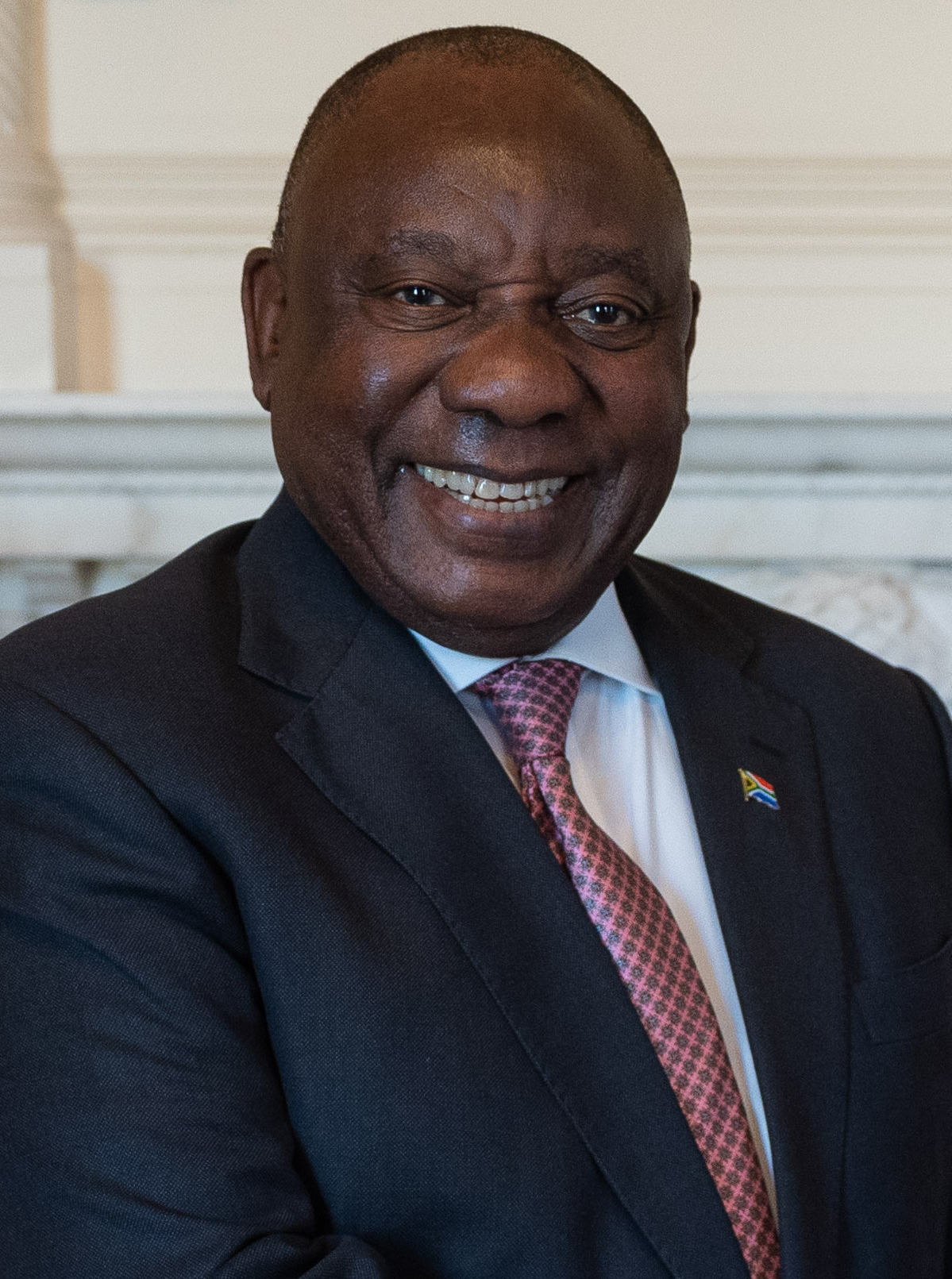
South Africa
Cyril Ramaphosa, President
2020 Chairperson of the African Union

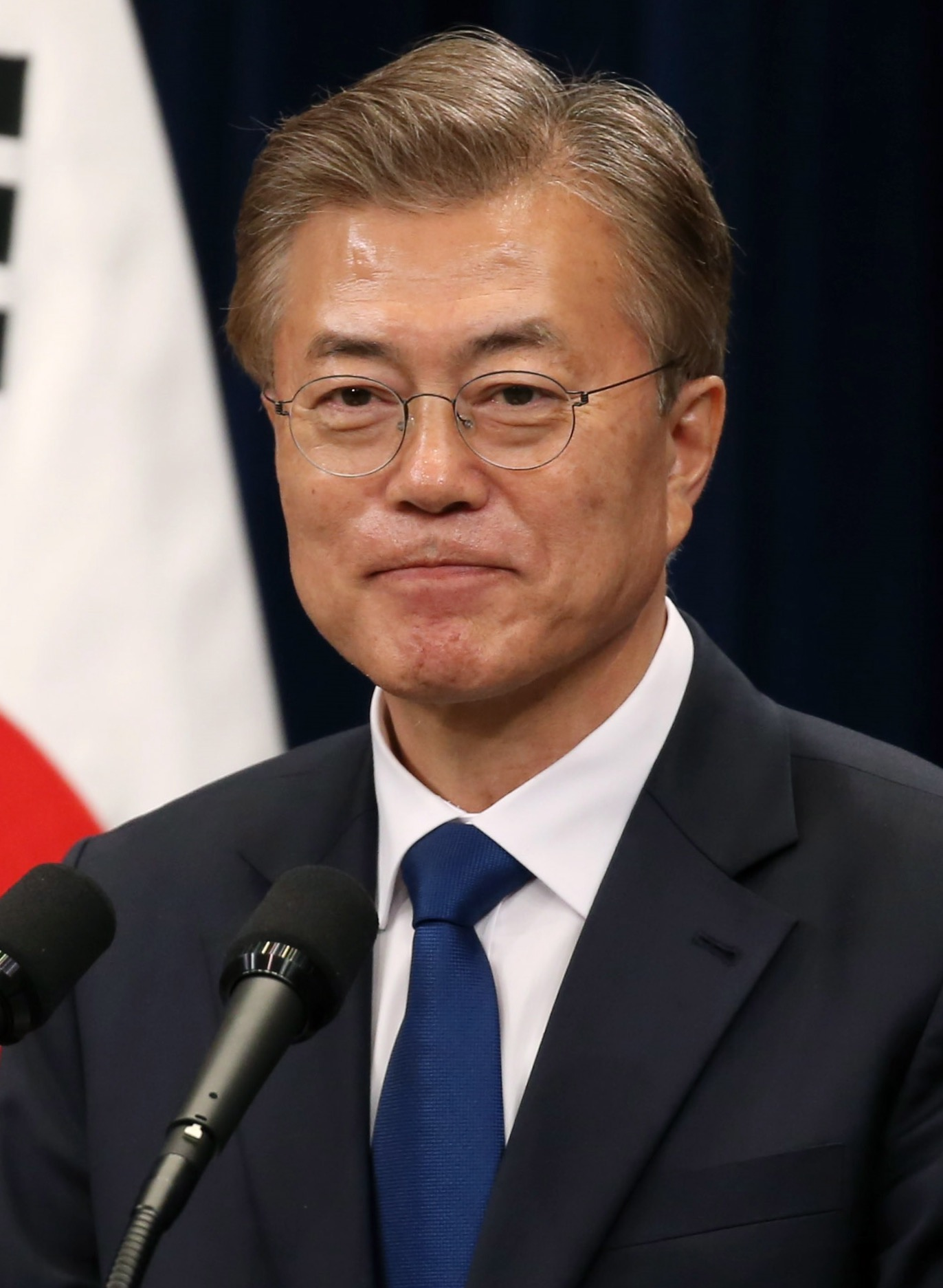
Republic of Korea
Moon Jae-in, President

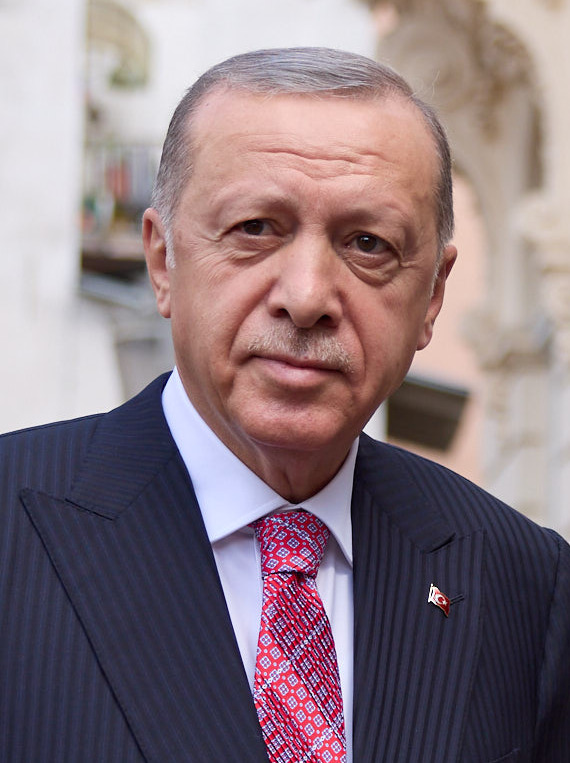
Turkey
Recep Tayyip Erdoğan, President

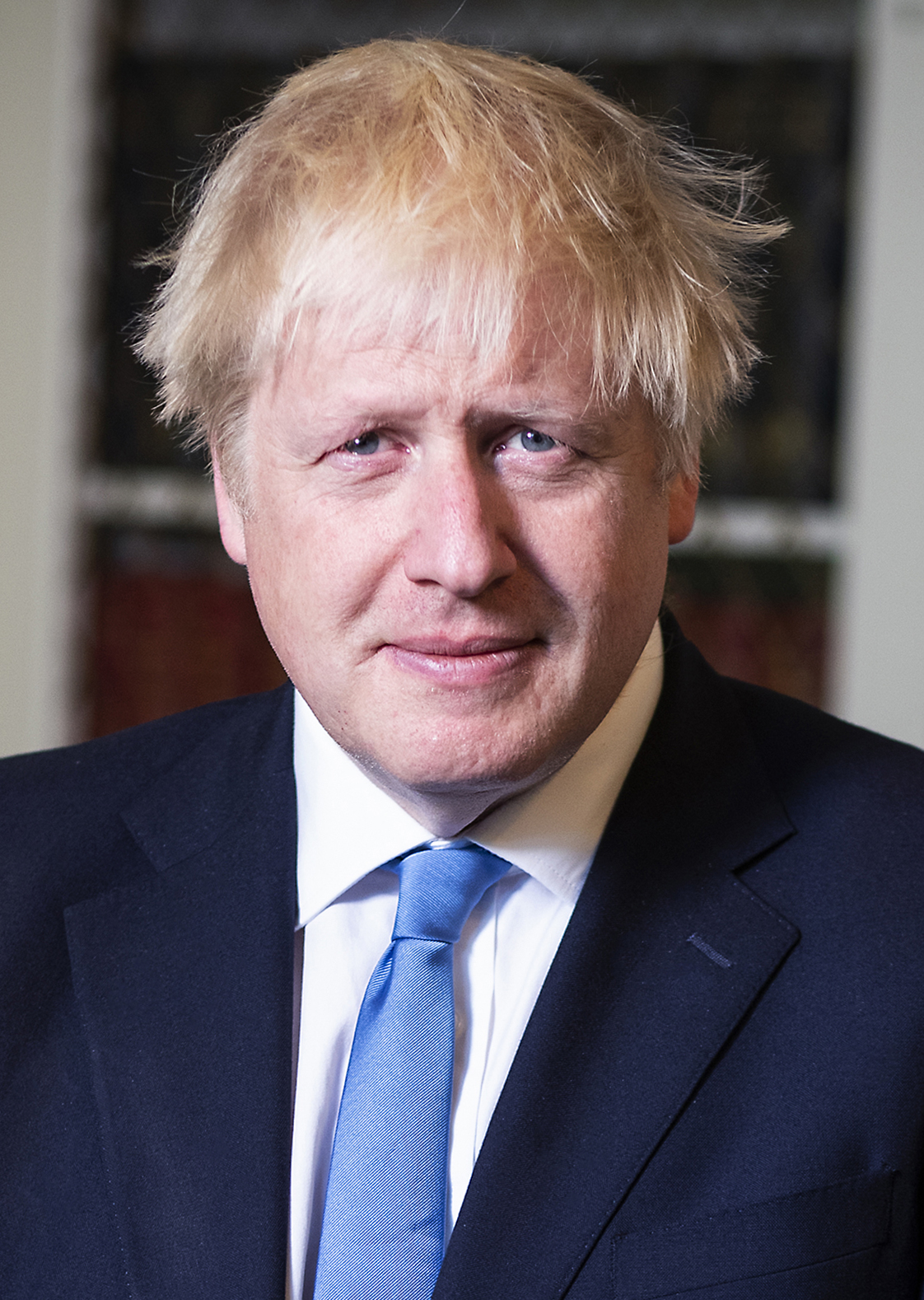
United Kingdom
Boris Johnson, Prime Minister

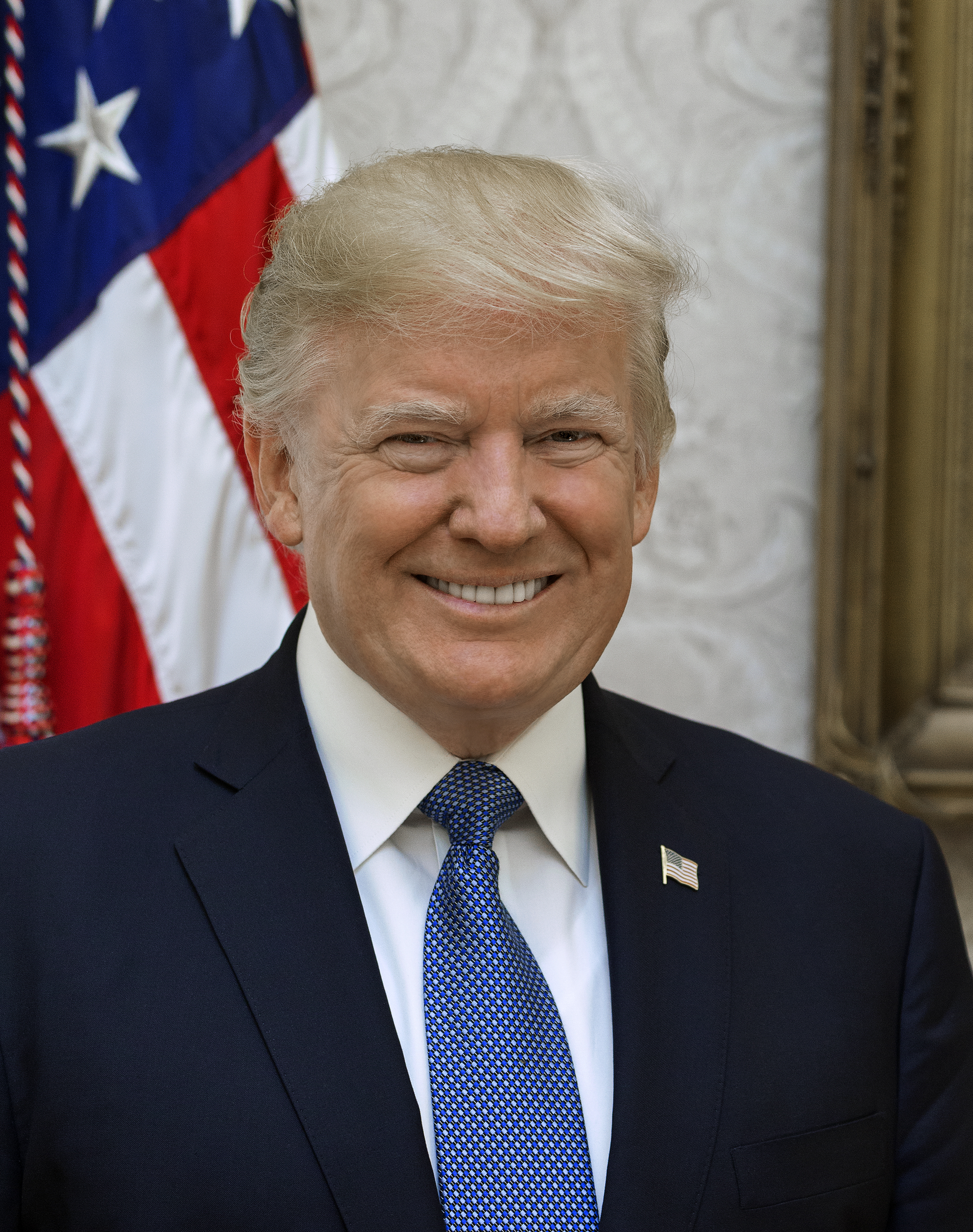
United States
Donald Trump, President

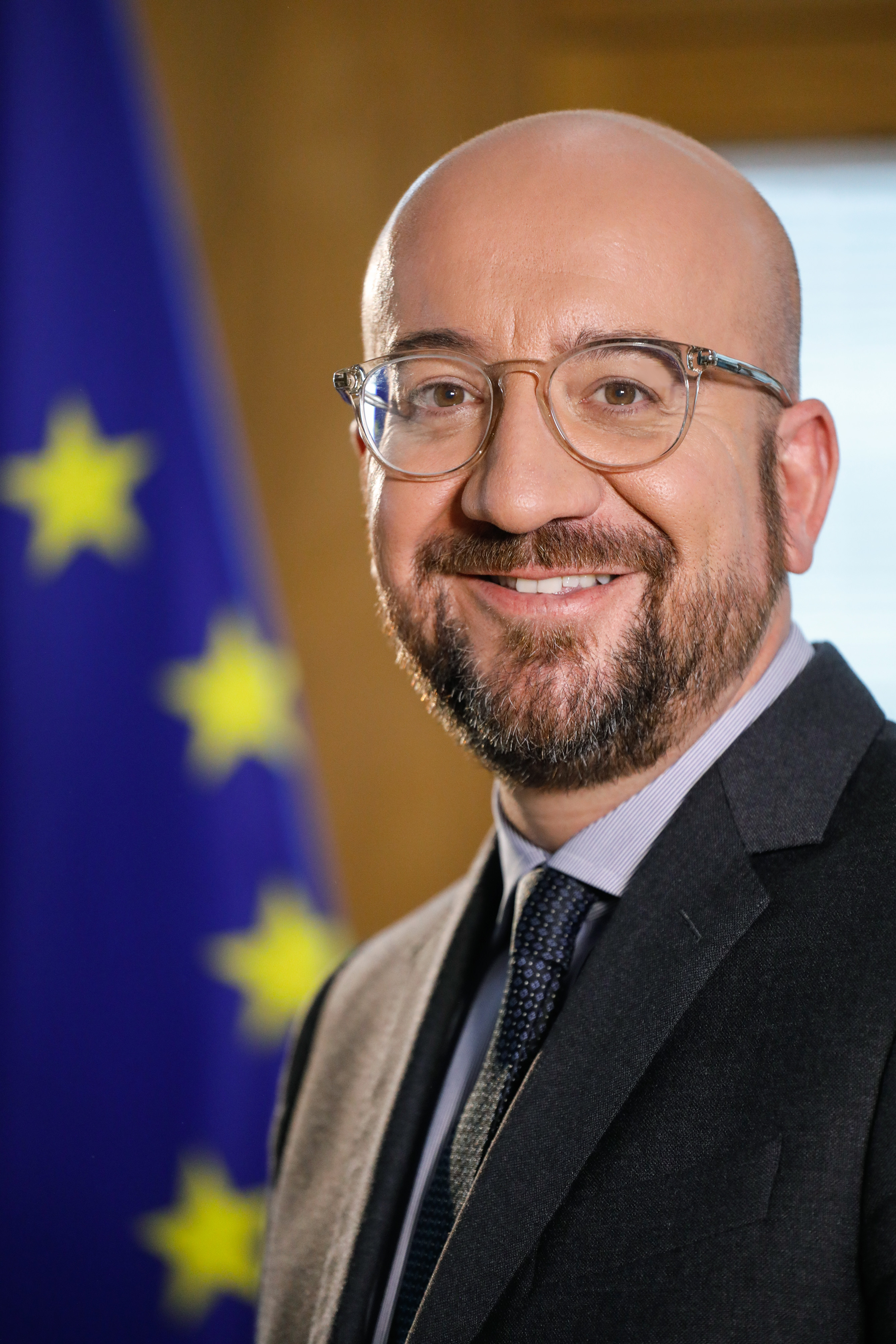
European Union
Charles Michel, President of the European Council

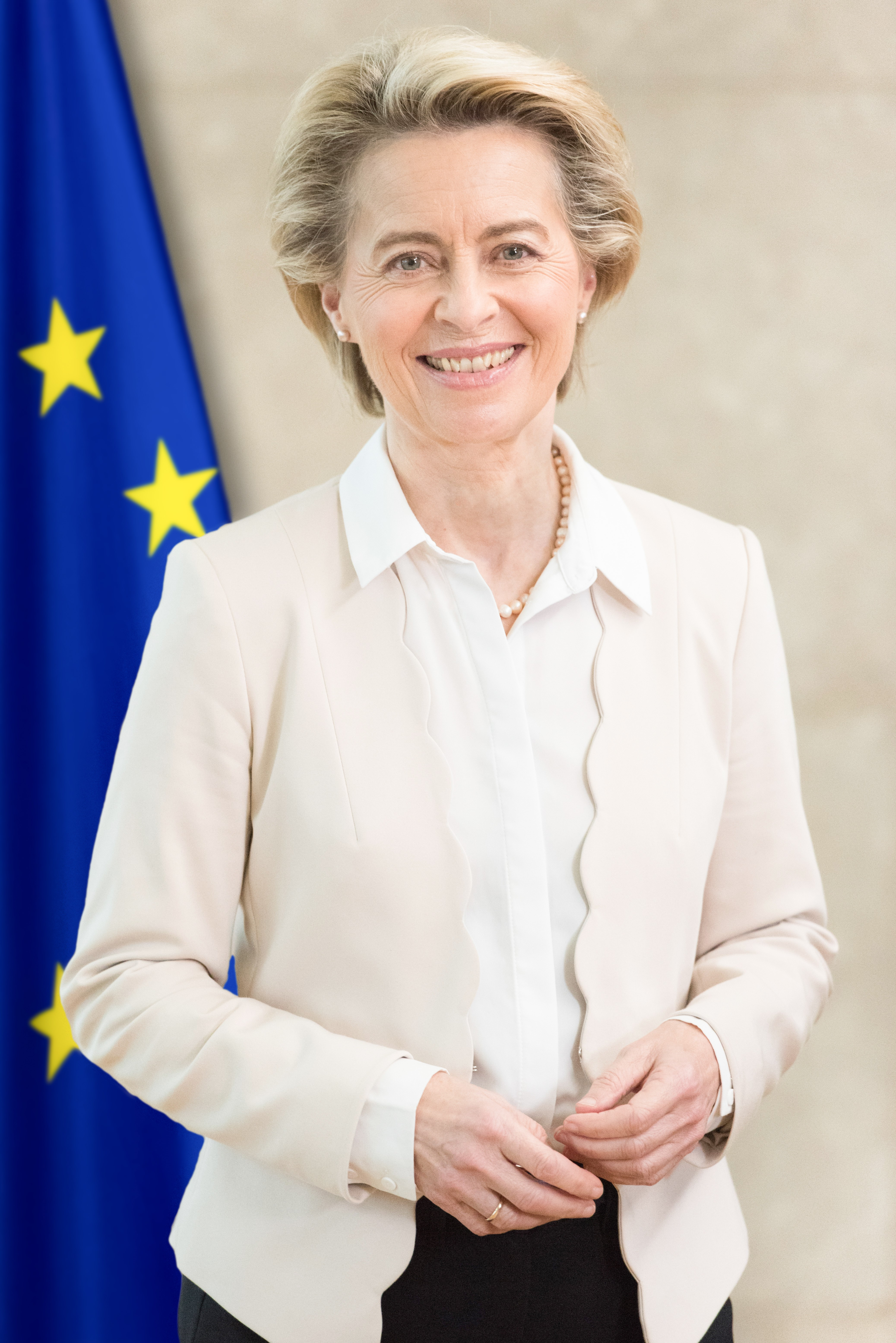
European Union
Ursula von der Leyen, President of the European Commission

== Invited guests ==
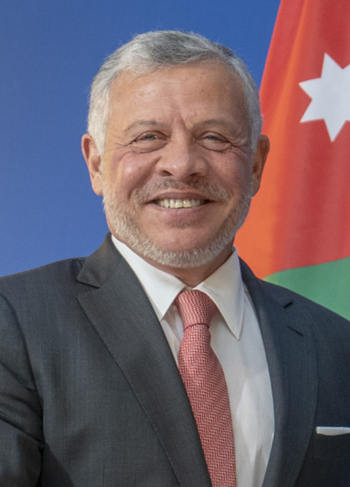
Jordan
Abdullah II, King, Guest invitee

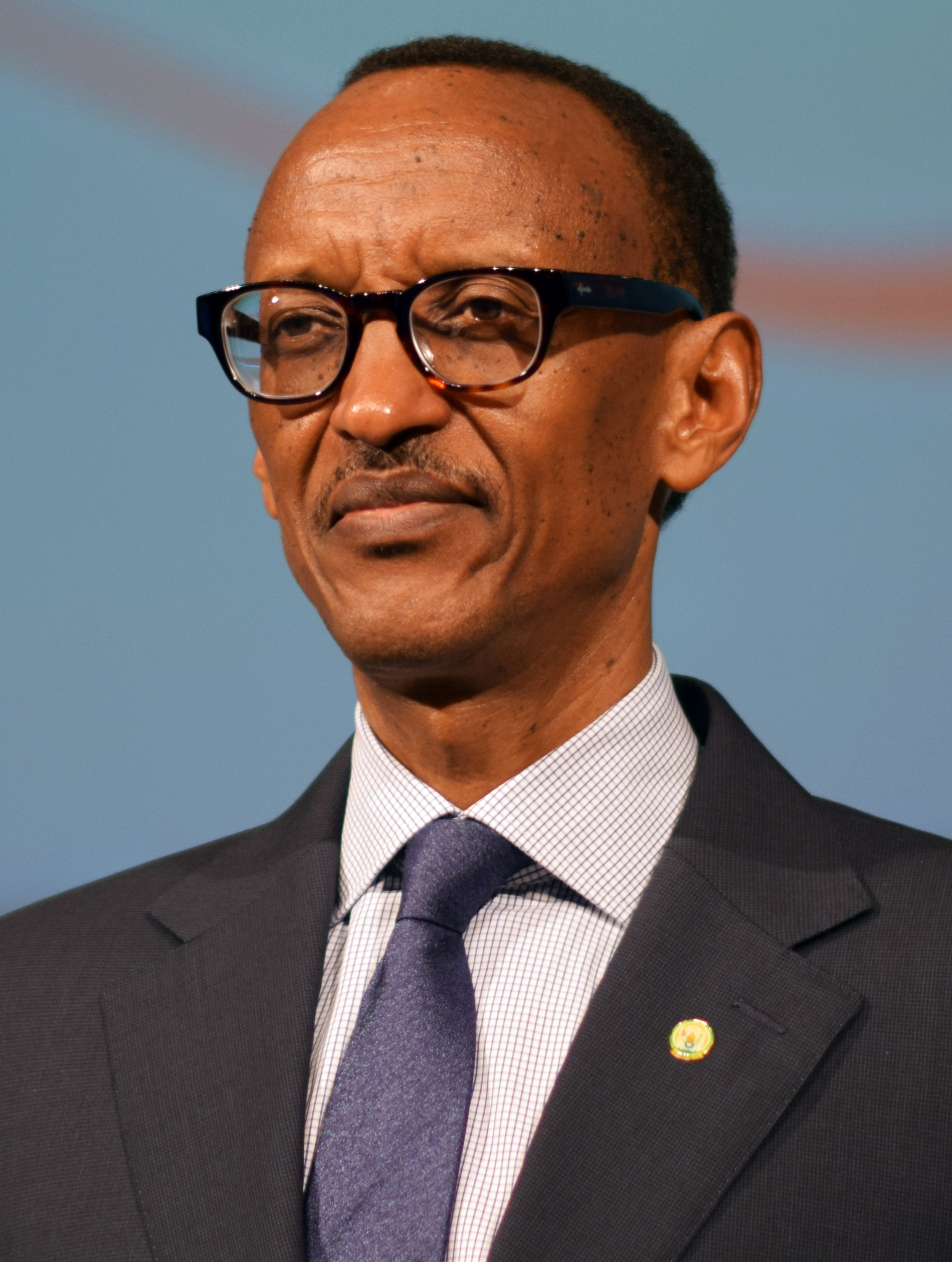
Rwanda
Paul Kagame, President, 2020 Chairperson of NEPAD

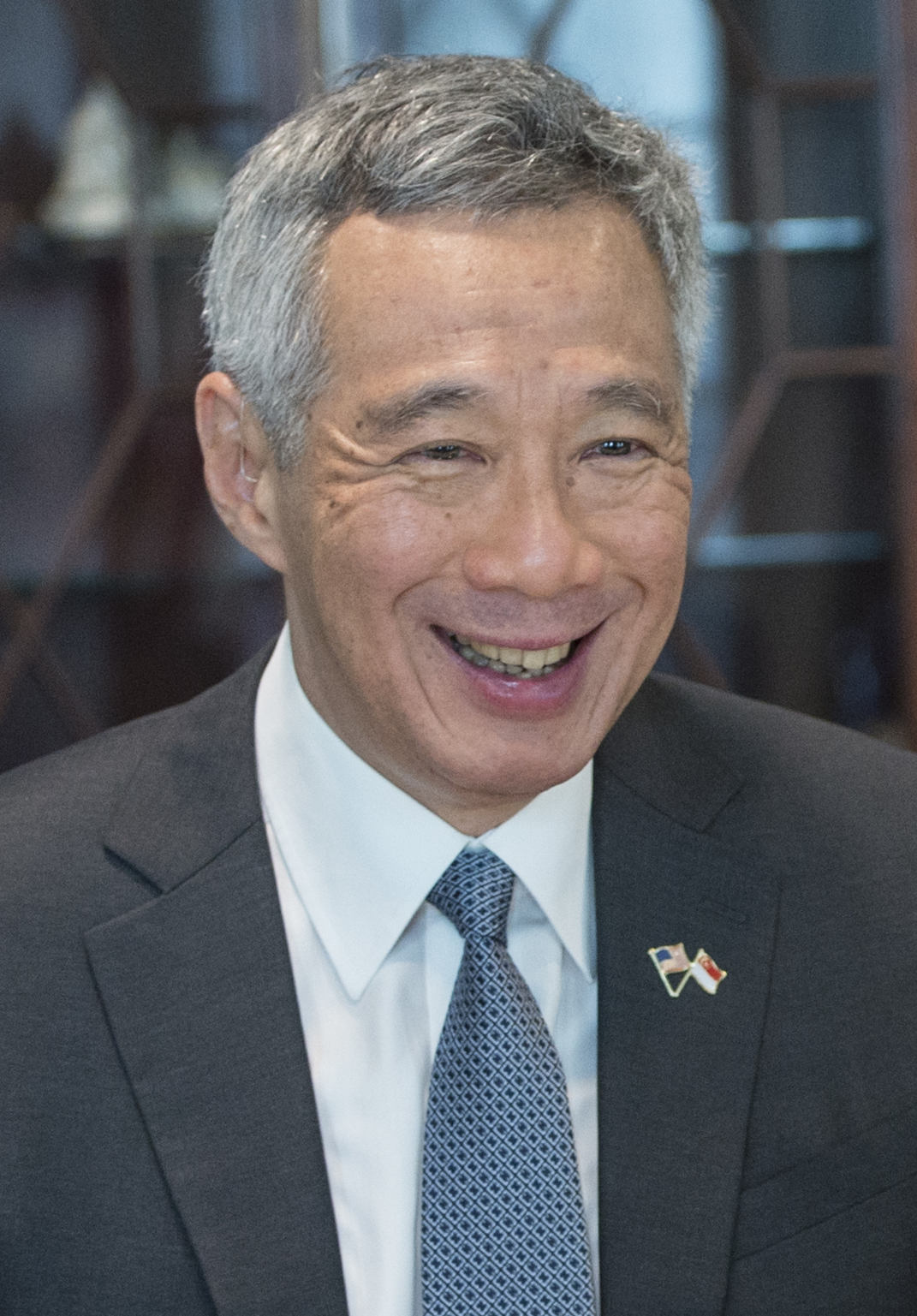
Singapore
Lee Hsien Loong, Prime Minister
Guest invitee

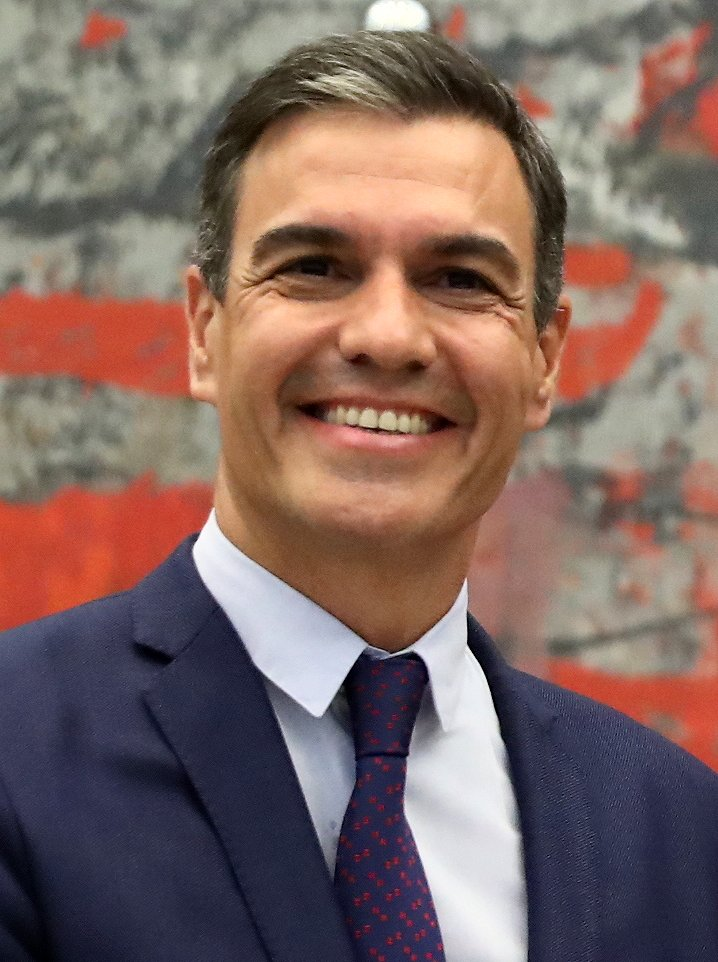
Spain
Pedro Sánchez, Prime Minister
Permanent guest invitee

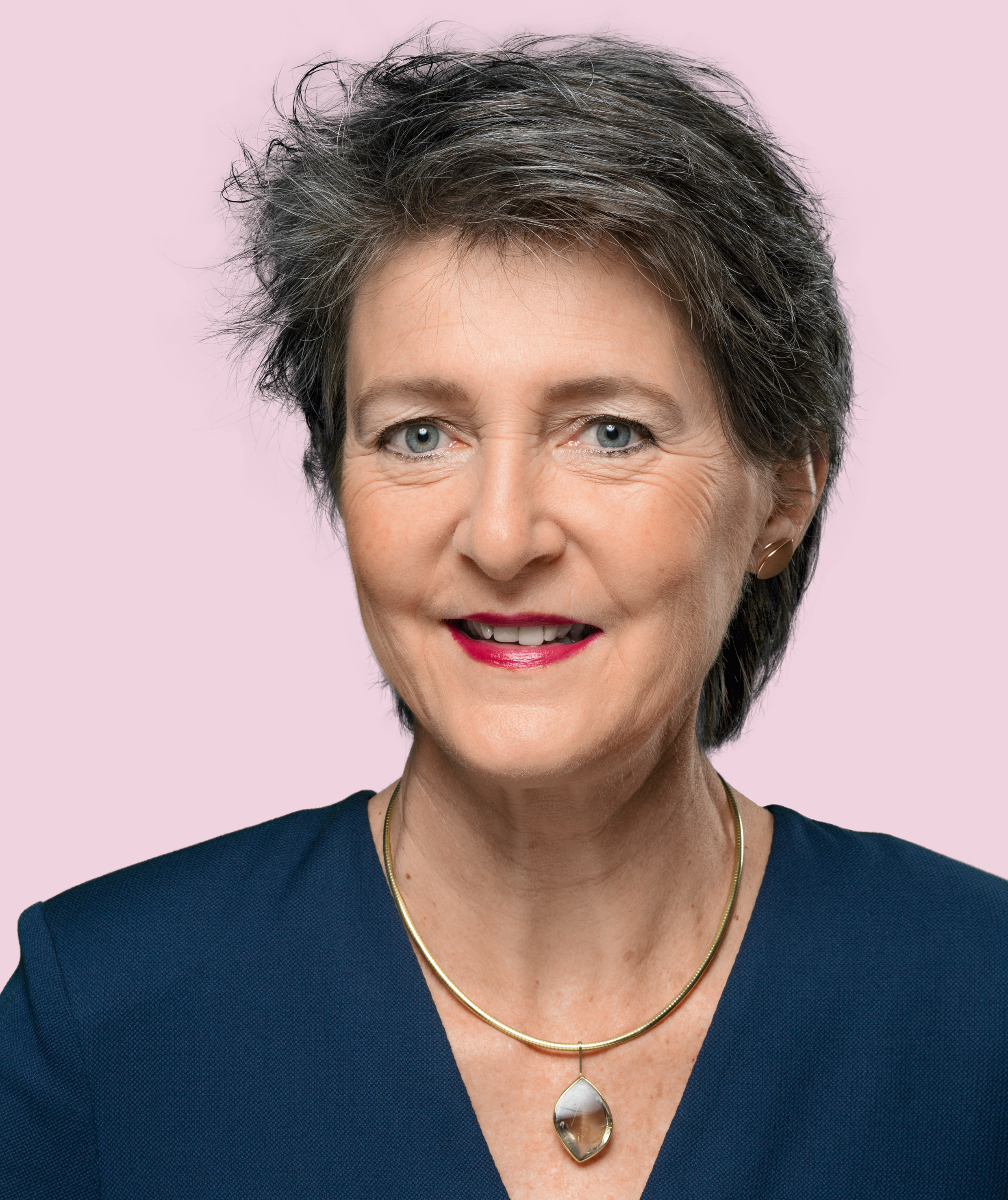
Switzerland
Simonetta Sommaruga, President
Guest invitee

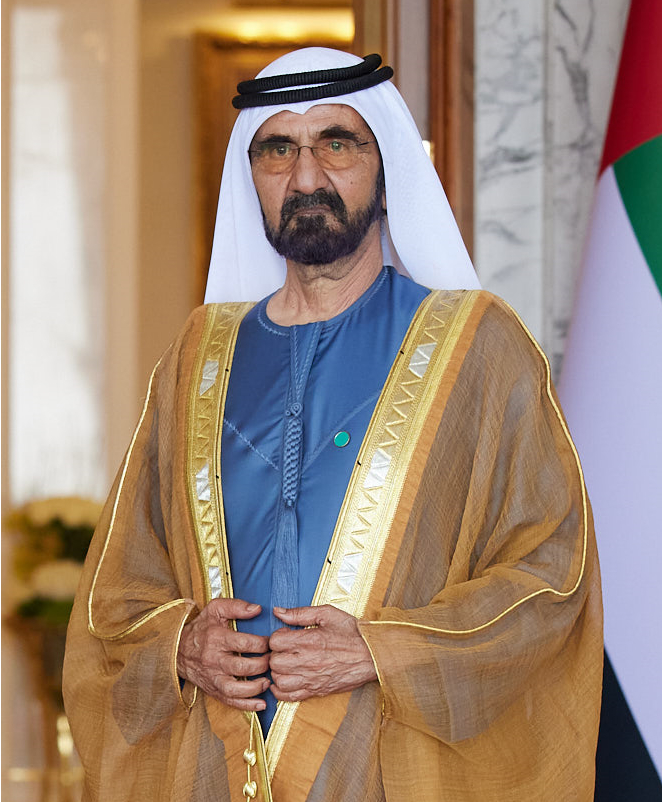
United Arab Emirates
Mohammed bin Rashid Al Maktoum, Vice President and Prime Minister
2020 Chairperson of the Gulf Cooperation Council

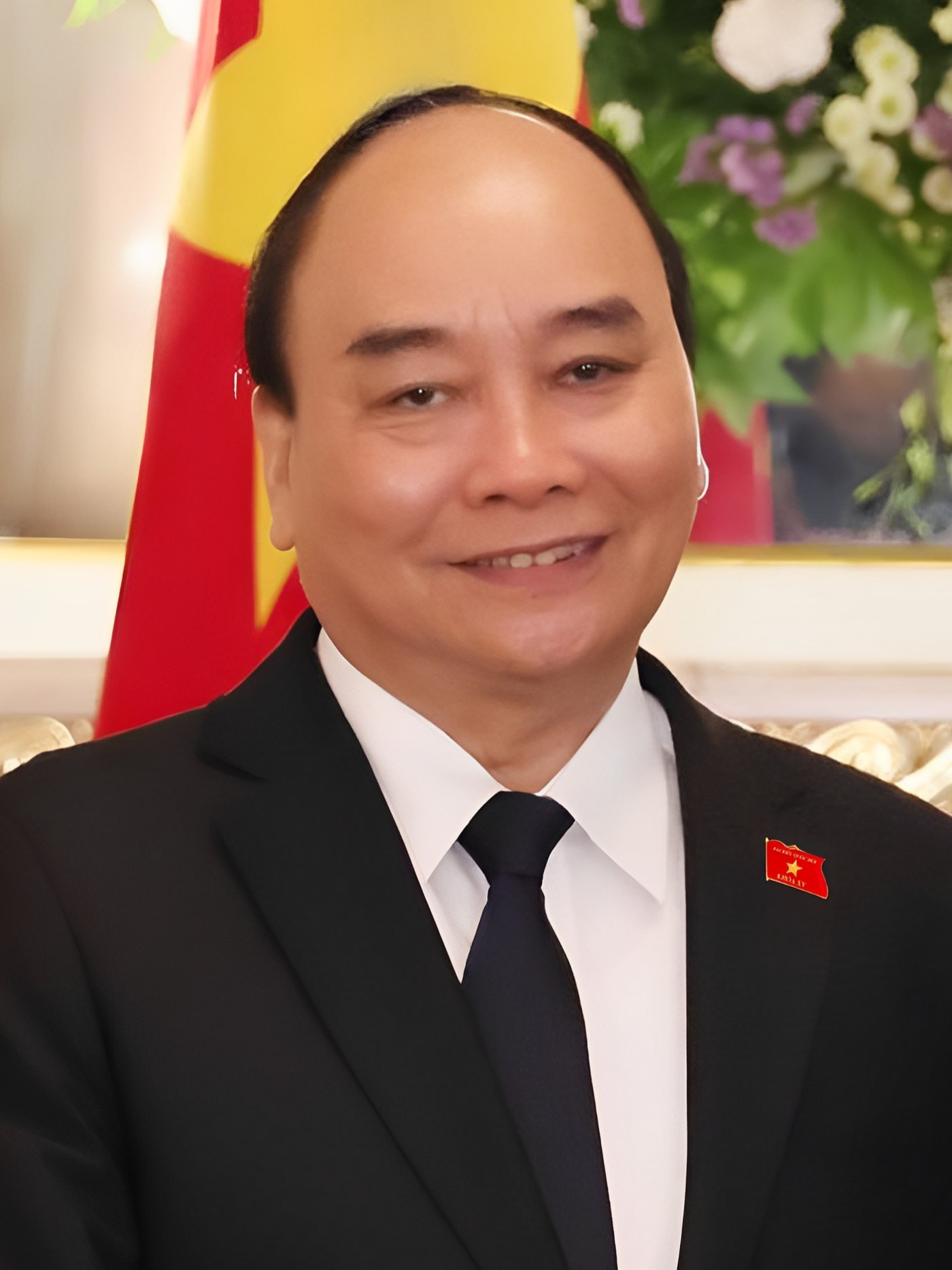
Vietnam
Nguyễn Xuân Phúc, Prime Minister
2020 Chairperson of Association of Southeast Asian Nations

== Presidency ==
The G20 Riyadh Summit was chaired by the Saudi King, Salman bin Abdulaziz.

The Kingdom of Saudi Arabia assumed the G20 Presidency in December 2019, leading up to the Leaders’ Summit to be held in Riyadh on 21–22 November 2020. The Kingdom would guide the work of the G20 under the theme of “Realizing Opportunities of the 21st Century for All” and would officially focus on three aims:

- Empowering People by creating the conditions in which all people – especially women and youth – can live, work and thrive.
- Safeguarding the Planet: by fostering collective efforts to protect our global commons.
- Shaping New Frontiers: by adopting long-term and bold strategies to share benefits of innovation and technological advancement.

Saudi Arabia released a 20 riyal commemorative banknote to mark the G20 presidency.

== First Sherpa meeting ==
The meeting was chaired by H.E. Dr. Fahad Almubarak, the Saudi Sherpa, who elaborated: “The G20 has a responsibility to the world to overcome current and emerging issues, to tackle global challenges together, and to make the world a better place for all."

== Sideline events ==
In the sideline of the summit, Saudi Arabia will be organizing preparatory ministerial meetings as well as other meetings of high governmental officials and representatives from the private sector and non-governmental organizations.

== Emergency meeting ==
On 26 March 2020, the G20 members held an emergency summit via video conference, maintaining social distancing amid COVID-19, in order to plan a coordinated global response against the COVID-19 pandemic. Chaired by King Salman of Saudi Arabia, who presided the 2020 summit, the meeting aimed at finding ways to tackle the economic implications of the virus on global economy, with people losing their jobs and incomes due to lockdowns and curfews imposed globally.

Human rights organization Amnesty International expressed disappointment at the exclusion of human rights-compliant action plans in the emergency summit. A series of demands such as moving towards a zero-carbon economy, guaranteeing access of information to all, and fully integrated gender perspective plans, were made by Amnesty. In addition, the NGO also demanded the release of pre-trial detainees, where possible, and prisoners of conscience such as Saudi Arabia's Raif Badawi, Loujain al-Hathloul, and Samar Badawi, to prevent the potential spread of coronavirus in prison populations owing to their low immunity.

== Historical background ==
Saudi Arabia's first participation in the G20 meetings was in 2008 Washington summit. By then and as the world suffered from a global crisis, Saudi Arabia was the tenth largest sovereign wealth fund in the world and the second largest oil reserves. Initially, the Saudi entrance to the G20 was due to its economic importance as an effective pricing force in the energy market.

== Controversies ==
On 7 October 2020, the European Parliament released a resolution denouncing the human rights violations of Saudi Arabia. The resolution passed by Member of the European Parliament (MEPs) published highlighting the Kingdom's brutal treatment of the Ethiopian migrants, who were abandoned by the Houthis in Yemen and later detained by Saudi authorities. The MEPs also criticized the country for keeping women's and other human rights defenders in detention, and urged the European Union members to downgrade their diplomatic and institutional representation at the Riyadh G20 Summit.

Under the Group of Twenty (G20) Riyadh summit, Saudi Arabia planned on hosting the B20 event, for which it was criticized by human rights groups and pro-democracy activists over the treatment of women in the country. Activists urged diplomats, politicians and blue chip companies like HSBC, Mastercard, and PepsiCo., to boycott the business event and said Saudi Arabia's real change-makers are behind bars, continuously facing abuse in prison cells, including electric shocks, flogging and sexual assault.

The British Secretary of State, Dominic Raab, received calls in November 2020 to boycott the G20 summit in Saudi Arabia because of the Kingdom's atrocious human rights record and recent attempts of driving the Bedouin tribe from their land to make way for its upcoming futuristic megacity project, Neom.

== See also ==
- 2019 G20 Osaka summit
- List of G20 summits
- List of G7 summits
- G20 Washington Summit 2008
