= Impersonality =

Impersonality may refer to:

- Impersonal passive voice, a verb voice that decreases the valency of an intransitive verb to zero
- Impersonal verb, a verb that cannot take a true subject
- Impersonal (grammar), a grammatical gender in languages such as Sumerian and Slavic languages
- Impersonal pronoun, a descriptor of a pronoun set, referred as one/one's/oneself in English
- Impersonal you, another word for generic you

== See also ==
- Unperson
- Nonperson
- Personal (disambiguation)
