= Personal =

Personal may refer to:

== Aspects of persons' respective individualities ==
- Privacy
- Personality
- Personal, personal advertisement, variety of classified advertisement used to find romance or friendship

== Companies ==
- Personal, Inc., a Washington, D.C.–based tech startup
- The Personal, a Canadian-based group car insurance and home insurance company
- Telecom Personal, a mobile phone company in Argentina and Paraguay

== Music ==
- Personal (Men of Vizion album), 1996
- Personal (George Howard album), 1990
- Personal (Florrie album), 2023
- Personal, an album by Quique González, or the title song
- "Message"/"Personal", a 2003 song by Aya Ueto
- "Personal" (Hrvy song), a song from Talk to Ya
- "Personal" (The Vamps song), a song from Night & Day
- "Personal", a song by Kehlani from SweetSexySavage
- "Personal", a song by Olly Murs from his 2012 album Right Place Right Time
- "Personal", a song by Against the Current from their 2018 album Past Lives

== Fiction ==
- Personal (novel), a 2014 novel by Lee Child
- "Personal" (Scott & Bailey), a 2011 television episode

== Linguistics ==
- Personal (grammar), grammatical gender in certain languages
- An adjective referring to grammatical person, such as in personal pronoun

== See also ==
- The Personals (disambiguation)
- Person
- Personality psychology
- Personalization
- Human scale
- Impersonality (disambiguation)
