= Desjardins General Insurance =

Canadian insurance company

- Type: Private
- Industry: Insurance
- Founded: 1944; 82 years ago in Montreal, Quebec, Canada
- Founder: Laurent Létourneau
- Headquarters: Lévis, Canada
- Area served: Most of Canada
- Key people: Denis Dubois
- Services: Auto insurance; Home insurance; Business insurance
- Parent: Desjardins General Insurance Group
- Website: desjardinsgeneralinsurance.com

Desjardins General Insurance (DGI) is the P&C insurance subsidiary of Desjardins General Insurance Group, itself a subsidiary of Desjardins Group. The brand is sister with Desjardins Financial Security, and both of them regroup under the banner of Desjardins Insurance.They now serve customers in four provinces of Canada: Quebec, Alberta, New Brunswick, and Ontario. DGI is one of the property and casualty leaders in Canada, and in 2014, Desjardins General Insurance ranked third for customer satisfaction in Quebec.

== About ==
Their main products are auto insurance, home insurance and business insurance, and are available through agents in the Desjardins Caisses network, Client Care Centres, website and mobile app.

== History ==
In 1944, Desjardins Group's first subsidiary was created under the name of "Société d'assurance des caisses populaires (SACP)", today rebranded Desjardins General Insurance. It was created to meet everybody's need, from their members to themselves: it offered in a single-contract protection against fire, hold-ups, burglaries and write-offs.

In 1987, in order to save their insurance company that was having financial problems, they completely turned around their business model and launched direct insurance. Insurance was now available directly through the caisses and call networks. It is considered to be "one of the most controversial developments to hit the industry", because it affected not only the Desjardins Group, but also the traditional brokerage network territory. They almost had to shut down, and had to go to court to defend their rights before their model was accepted.

In 2008, DGI extended their home and auto insurance services outside their usual range to include the Ontario sector.

In 2014, Desjardins Group acquired the Canadian operations of State Farm to become the second-largest property and casualty insurer in Canada. Until 2018, all 1.2 million customers in Ontario, Alberta and New Brunswick were still served under the name of State Farm, but on May 1, 2018, Desjardins officially started a campaign to rebrand State Farm Canada as Desjardins Insurance Agents. The transition is to be done by December 31, 2019.

== The Personal ==
Founded in 1974, The Personal is subsidiary of Desjardins General Insurance and a Canada property and casualty (P&C) group insurer that specializes in home insurance and auto insurance. They offer multiple services to their partners, and are specialized in offering group exclusive rates. They represent over 700 public and private organizations, professional orders and unions across Canada. "It prides itself on high customer satisfaction, with 96% of respondents saying they are satisfied after making a claim and 95% of insurance holders renewing their policies each year. The renewal rate is one of the highest in the insurance industry."

=== History ===
In 1974, in Canada, The Personal created the auto and home group insurance concept. The concept of group insurance was popular for life policies, but for the first time the concept was applied to cars and homes. Auto and home were then the only products offered; later The Personal broadened their range of services to include other products, such as recreational vehicles, travel and pets.

On May 2, 1986, The Personal (then called The Security), was reaching an agreement with the Centrale de l'enseignement du Québec (CEQ), who were looking for a group insurance. This agreement signed the official start of the history of group P&C insurance in Quebec.

=== Prices and distinctions ===
According to a J.D. Power study about customer satisfaction with home insurance, The Personal ranked first in Quebec in 2015. The same study in 2018 for the auto insurance sector also ranked the company as first in Canada.

== See also ==
- P&C Insurance
- Desjardins Insurance
- Desjardins Financial Security
- Desjardins Group
