= Desjardins Insurance =

Canadian insurance company

- Type: Subsidiary
- Industry: Insurance
- Predecessor: State Farm Insurance of Canada
- Founded: 1944; 82 years ago in Lévis, Canada
- Headquarters: Lévis, Canada
- Area served: Most of Canada
- Services: Life insurance; General insurance; Business insurance
- Parent: Desjardins Group
- Website: desjardinsinsurance.com

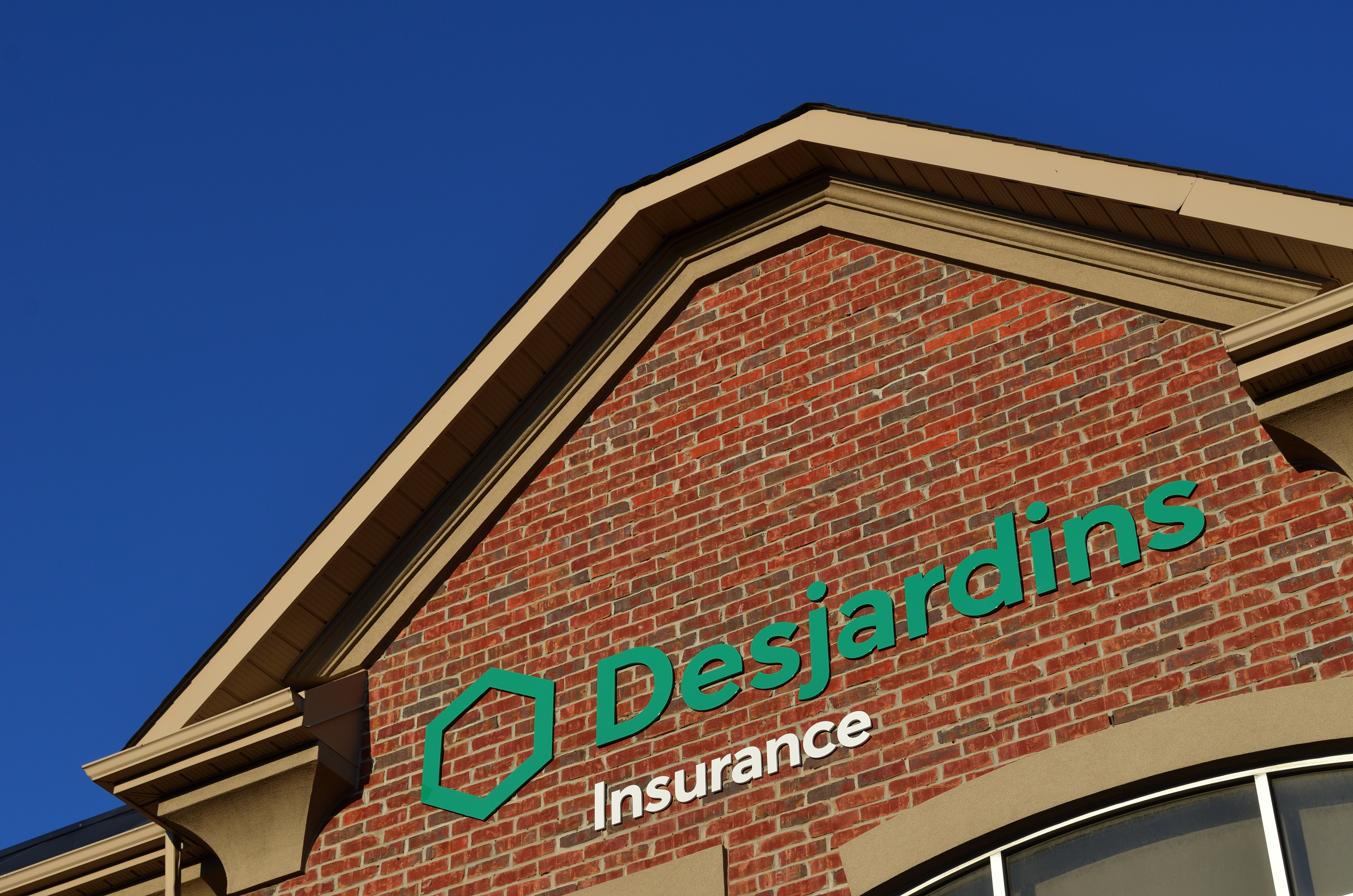
Desjardins Insurance in Markham, ON

Desjardins Insurance is an insurance unit of the Desjardins Group, an association of credit unions operating in Canada. Desjardins Insurance has two principal subsidiaries: Desjardins Financial Security and Desjardins General Insurance.

== History ==
The first subsidiary of Desjardins Group was established in 1944 under the name of "Société d'assurance des caisses populaires" (SACP). In 1948, Desjardins Life Insurance, known today as Desjardins Financial Security (DFS), was created. In the post-war environment, they merged under a common name of Desjardins Insurance.

In 2015, Desjardins Insurance acquired the Canadian operations of U.S. based insurer State Farm, which made Desjardins the second largest property and casualty insurer in Canada and the largest in Ontario. This acquisition almost doubled the company's premiums, increasing from 2 billion to 4 billion. At the time, approximately 50% of their volume came from what was once State Farm. Other business derives from Desjardin's group insurance (The Personal), white label activities with Scotiabank, brokerage with Western Financial, and activities related to the exclusive agents of Quebec. In 2018, State Farm Canada was officially rebranded to Desjardins Insurance through Desjardins Insurance Agents. The whole transition was to be completed by December 31, 2019.

== See also ==
- Lévis
- Desjardins Group
- Desjardins General Insurance
- Desjardins Financial Security
