= Desjardins Ontario Credit Union =

The Desjardins Ontario Credit Union is a federation of credit unions formed on 1 January 2020 with the merger of 11 Ontario Desjardins-affiliated credit unions, along with its federation, into one credit union insured by the FRSAO. The credit union has 50 branches and 130,000 members. Billy Boucher is the credit union's first CEO.

In October 2025, Desjardins was formally announced as the presenting sponsor of the Sudbury Wolves for a three-year term.

== Merged credit unions ==
- Caisse populaire d'Alfred Limitée (#0176)
- Caisse populaire de Cornwall Inc. (#2123)
- Caisse populaire de Hawkesbury Limitée (#0495)
- Caisse populaire Nouvel-Horizon Inc. (#2179)
- Caisse Populaire Rideau-Vision d'Ottawa Inc. (#2206)
- Caisse populaire Sud-Ouest Ontario Inc. (#2224)
- Caisse populaire Trillium Inc. (#2209)
- Caisse populaire de la Vallée (#2162)
- Caisse populaire Vallée Est Ltée. (#2212)
- Caisse populaire Vermillon (#2215)
- Caisse populaire Voyageurs Inc. (#2226)
- La Fédération des Caisses populaires de l'Ontario Inc. (#0272)
