= The Personals =

The Personals can refer to:

- Personal advertisement, personal classified advertisement used to find romance or friendship
- The Personals (1982 film), an American film directed by Peter Markle
- The Personals (1998 American film), a short documentary film directed by Keiko Ibi
- The Personals (1998 Taiwanese film), a film directed by Chen Kuo-fu

== See also ==
- Personal (disambiguation)
