= 2008 G20 Washington summit =

Annual G20 conference

G20 Summit on Financial Markets and the World Economy 1st G20 summit
- 14–15 November 2008
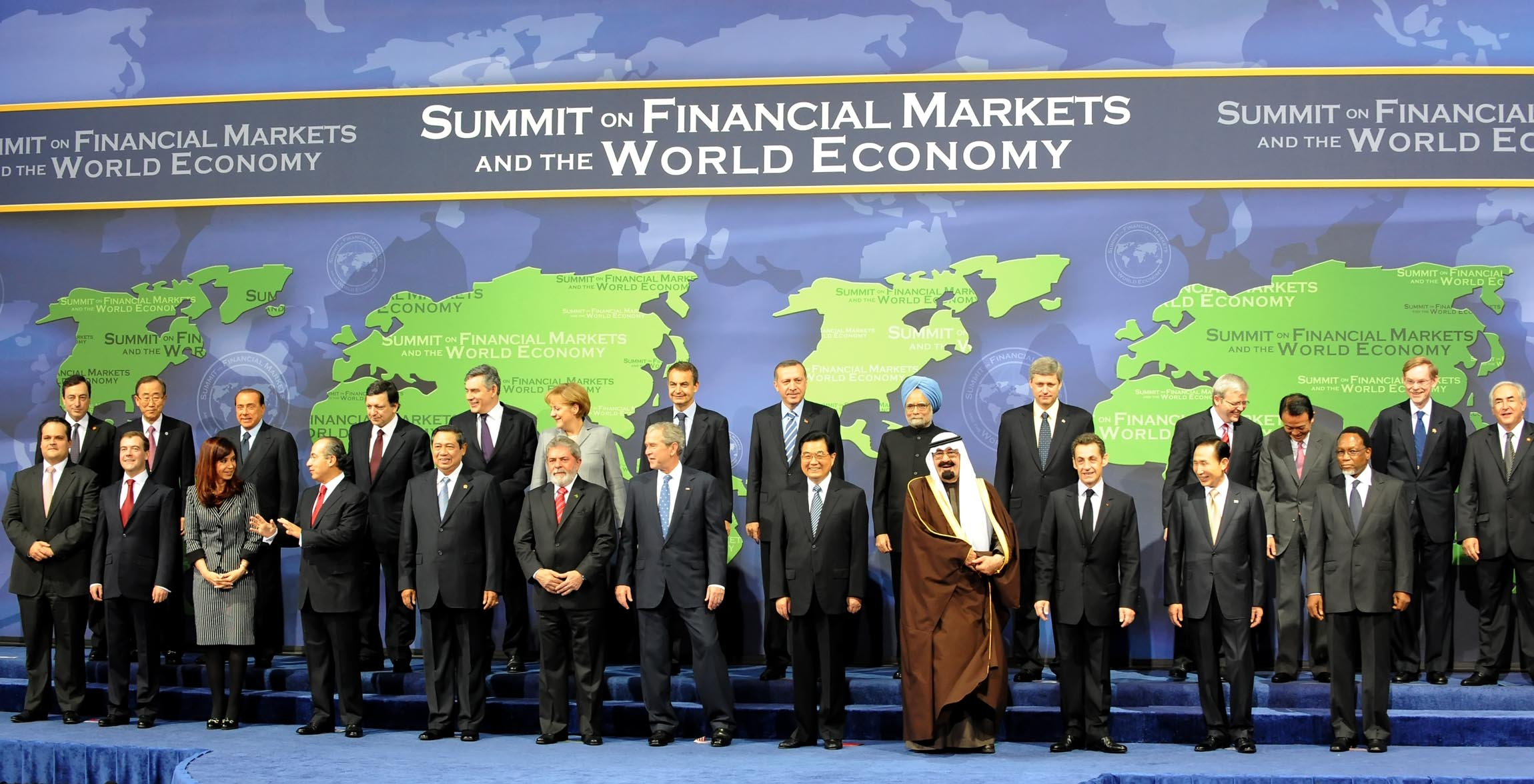
- The G20 in Washington, D.C.
- Host country: United States
- Cities: Washington, D.C.
- Venues: National Building Museum
- Participants: G20
- Chair: George W. Bush

Key points
- Common understanding of the root causes of the 2008 financial crisis; Review of countries' past and future actions addressing the immediate crisis and contributing to growth; Agreement on common principles for reforming financial markets; Action plan to implement those principles and to develop further specific recommendations for later review; Reaffirmation of commitment to free market principles

The 2008 G20 Washington Summit on Financial Markets and the World Economy was the first meeting, held in Washington, D.C., United States. It achieved general agreement amongst the G20 on how to cooperate in key areas so as to strengthen economic growth, deal with the 2008 financial crisis, and lay the foundation for reform to avoid similar crises in the future. The Summit resulted from an initiative by the French and European Union President, Nicolas Sarkozy, Australian Prime Minister Kevin Rudd, and the British Prime Minister, Gordon Brown. In connection with the G7 finance ministers on October 11, 2008, United States President George W. Bush stated that the next meeting of the G20 would be important in finding solutions to the 2008 financial crisis. Since many economists and politicians called for a new Bretton Woods system (a monetary management which was instituted after World War II) to overhaul the world's financial structure, the meeting has sometimes been described by the media as Bretton Woods II.

== Preliminary history ==
=== Approaches in the early 2000s ===
Bretton Woods II was an informal designation for the system of currency relations which developed during the '00s . As described by political economist Daniel Drezner, "Under this system, the U.S. is running massive current account deficits to be the source of export-led growth for other countries. To fund this deficit, central banks, particularly those on the Pacific Rim, are buying up dollars and dollar-denominated assets."

The notion of a "revived Bretton Woods system" was introduced in a 2004 paper by Dooley, Folkerts-Landau, and Garber, in which it is described as arising after the end of the Cold War, out of the choice of countries, "mainly in Asia, [which] chose the same periphery strategy as immediate post-war Europe and Japan, undervaluing the exchange rate, managing sizable foreign exchange interventions, imposing controls, accumulating reserves, and encouraging export-led growth by sending goods to the competitive center countries. In 2005, Roubini and Setser opined that: "If the US does not take policy steps to reduce its need for external financing before it exhausts the world's central banks willingness to keep adding to their dollar reserves – and if the rest of the world does not take steps to reduce its dependence on an unsustainable expansion in US domestic demand to support its own growth – the risk of a hard landing for the US and global economy will grow.... a sharp fall in the value of the US dollar, a rapid increase in US long-term interest rates and a sharp fall in the price of a range of risk assets including equities and housing. The asset price adjustment would lead to a severe slowdown in the US, and the fall in US imports associated with the US slowdown and the dollar's fall would lead to a global severe economic slowdown, if not an outright recession."

=== 2008 financial crisis ===
On September 26, 2008, Nicolas Sarkozy, said, "We must rethink the financial system from scratch, as at Bretton Woods."

On October 13, 2008, British Prime Minister Gordon Brown said world leaders must meet to agree to a new economic system. "We must have a new Bretton Woods, building a new international financial architecture for the years ahead." However, Brown's approach was quite different than the original Bretton Woods system, emphasising the continuation of globalization and free trade as opposed to a return to fixed exchange rates. There were tensions between Brown and Sarkozy, who argued that the "Anglo-Saxon" model of unrestrained markets has failed.

Italian Economics Minister Giulio Tremonti said that Italy would use its 2009 chairmanship to push for a "New Bretton Woods." He was critical of the U.S.'s response to the 2008 financial crisis, and suggested that the dollar may be superseded as the base currency of the Bretton Woods system. On 20 October 2008, Tremonti told the Italian daily Corriere della Sera that proposals for a new Bretton Woods had been spread for many years by American political activist Lyndon LaRouche.

== The Summit ==
Participating G20 nations Nations allowed extraordinary participation (The Netherlands and Spain) Nations represented under the European Union

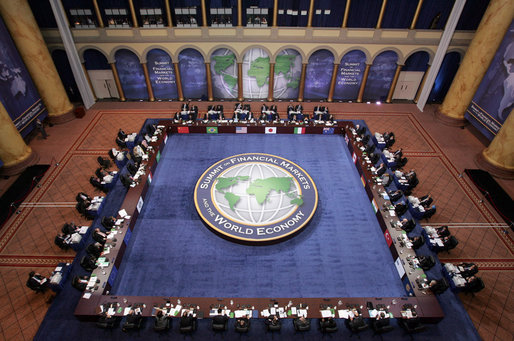
G20 leaders and delegates attend the Summit on Financial Markets and the World Economy Saturday at the National Building Museum in Washington, D.C. on November 15, 2008.

The formula is "G7 plus". In announcing the summit, US President George Bush said that the summit would bring together members of the G20. The G20 was set up to respond to the financial turmoil of 1997-99 through the development of policies that "promote international financial stability". The G20 comprises countries considered to be systemically important, but omits over 170 governments (192 governments are members of the United Nations).

The first meeting of the G20 leaders on financial markets and the world economy was held in Washington, D.C. on November 14–15, 2008, at the National Building Museum. The participants were: Argentina, Australia, Brazil, Canada, the People's Republic of China, France, Germany, India, Indonesia, Italy, Japan, Mexico, Republic of Korea, Russia, Saudi Arabia, South Africa, Turkey, the United Kingdom, the United States of America, the European Union (represented by France's President Nicolas Sarkozy as President of the European Council, as well as by José Manuel Barroso, president of the European Commission), the Netherlands (allowed extraordinary presence), Spain (allowed extraordinary presence), the World Bank, the International Monetary Fund and the Financial Stability Forum. Although Dutch Prime Minister Jan Peter Balkenende arrived at Andrews Air Force Base on the evening of November 14, he immediately returned to the Netherlands when notified of the death of his father; the Netherlands was instead represented by State Secretary Jan Kees de Jager.

Spanish Prime Minister José Luis Rodríguez Zapatero was not initially invited, but was "so desperate to secure an invitation" to the summit, that he traveled "to Asia to seek the help of President Hu Jintao of China." Zapatero eventually extracted an invitation through "intense lobbying" of French President Nicolas Sarkozy, who happened to hold two invitations (the second French invitation was due to the fact that France held the Presidency of the Council of the European Union during this period).

=== Core participants ===
The following participants of the Washington summit include the core members of the G20, which comprises 19 countries and the European Union which is represented by its two governing bodies, the European Council and the European Commission, as well as other nations and regional organizations invited to take part.

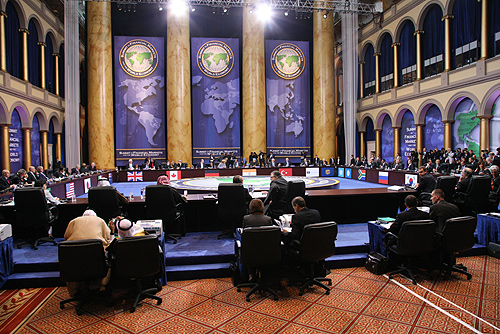
Working sessions of the G20 heads of states and governments.

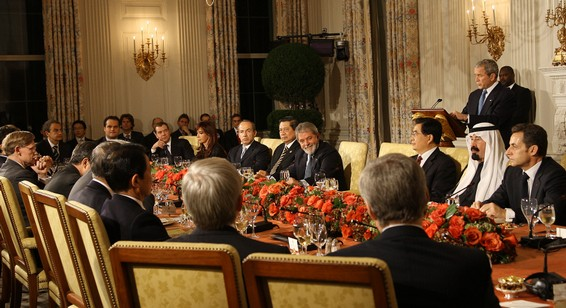
President Bush and the other summit leaders at a working dinner in the East Wing of the White House.

**Core G20 members** Host nation and leader are indicated in bold text.
Member		Represented by	Title
(Argentina)	Argentina	Cristina Fernández de Kirchner	President
(Australia)	Australia	Kevin Rudd	Prime Minister
(Brazil)	Brazil	Luiz Inácio Lula da Silva	President
(Canada)	Canada	Stephen Harper	Prime Minister
(China)	China	Hu Jintao	CCP General Secretary; President (Note: The president of China is legally a ceremonial office, but the general secretary of the Chinese Communist Party (de facto top leader in a one-party communist state) has always held this office since 1993 except for the months of transition, and then-CCP general secretary was Hu Jintao, who was also the Chinese president.)
(France)	France	Nicolas Sarkozy	President
(Germany)	Germany	Angela Merkel	Chancellor
(India)	India	Manmohan Singh	Prime Minister
(Indonesia)	Indonesia	Susilo Bambang Yudhoyono	President
(Italy)	Italy	Silvio Berlusconi	Prime Minister
(Japan)	Japan	Tarō Asō	Prime Minister
(Mexico)	Mexico	Felipe Calderón	President
(Russia)	Russia	Dmitry Medvedev	President
(Saudi Arabia)	Saudi Arabia	Abdullah bin Abdul Aziz	King
(South Africa)	South Africa	Kgalema Motlanthe	President
(South Korea)	South Korea	Lee Myung-bak	President
(Turkey)	Turkey	Recep Tayyip Erdoğan	Prime Minister
(United Kingdom)	United Kingdom	Gordon Brown	Prime Minister
(United States)	**United States**	**George W. Bush**	**President**
(European Union)	European Union (European Commission)	Jose Manuel Barroso	President
**Invited states**
State		Represented by	Title
(Netherlands)	Netherlands	Jan Peter Balkenende	Prime Minister
(Spain)	Spain	José Luis Rodríguez Zapatero	Prime Minister
**International organisations**
Organisation		Represented by	Title
	Financial Stability Forum	Mario Draghi	Chairman
	International Monetary Fund	Dominique Strauss-Kahn	Managing Director
(United Nations)	United Nations	Ban Ki-moon	Secretary General
	World Bank Group	Robert Zoellick	President

=== Suggestions ===
German Chancellor Angela Merkel and French President Nicolas Sarkozy said "Bretton Woods II" should bring about "genuine, all-encompassing reform of the international financial system". The Council of the European Union sees the meeting as "tak[ing] early decisions on transparency, global standards of regulation, cross-border supervision and crisis management, to avoid conflicts of interest and to create an early warning system, so as to engender confidence among savers and investors in every country." In announcing the meeting, the spokesperson for US President George Bush said that "leaders will review progress being made to address the current financial crisis, advance a common understanding of its causes, and, in order to avoid a repetition, agree on a common set of principles for reform of the regulatory and institutional regimes for the world's financial sector". UK Prime Minister Gordon Brown, in a mid-October speech, set out several principles. These include transparency (internationally agreed accounting standards, credit insurance market standards), integrity (credit agencies, executive pay), responsibility (board member competency and expertise), sound banking practice (protecting against speculative bubbles). While addressing the G20 leaders, Chinese leader Hu Jintao listed four priorities in reforming the international financial system: stepping up international cooperation in financial regulation; advancing reform of international financial institutions; encouraging regional financial cooperation; and improving the international currency system. Foreign ministry spokesman Qin Gang said the agreement was "comprehensive, positive and balanced". Prior to this summit, Japan's Prime Minister, Taro Aso, had contributed feasible action plan based on the analysis of the surplus of Japan's international balance of payments in spite of her prolonged economic slump to The Wall Street Journal, and also provided his idea includes funding in the meeting. Eventually Japan provided the International Monetary Fund 100 billion U.S. dollar to bolster the fund during the 2008 financial crisis.

=== Key achievements ===
The White House reported that the summit had reached what would be the Washington declaration. The five key objectives the leaders agreed upon were:

- reached a common understanding of the root causes of the global crisis;
- reviewed actions countries had taken and would take in the future to address the immediate crisis and strengthen growth;
- agreed on common principles for reforming their financial markets;
- launched an action plan to implement those principles and asked ministers to develop further specific recommendations that would be reviewed by leaders at a subsequent summit; and
- reaffirmed their commitment to free market principles.

A summary of the meeting's other salient points is presented by the White House in the "Fact Sheet" while the full conclusions are given in the Summit Declaration.

Despite the optimism expressed by many of those present, doubts soon began to emerge about the success of the meeting and the chances of achieving all its objectives.

The 2009 G20 management troika (U.K., Brazil, South Korea) is charged with coordinating the task of coming up with the content and method of implementing the 47 short and mid-term objectives by March 2009.

Follow-up Summit meetings were held on April 2, 2009 in London, and in September 2009 in Pittsburgh.

=== Reactions ===
==== From participating delegations ====
- – Brazilian President Luiz Inácio Lula da Silva welcomed the summit's decision to give a role to the emerging economic powers like Brazil, Mexico, Russia, China and India in restructuring the global economy.
- (China) – Chinese President and CCP General Secretary Hu Jintao listed four priorities in reforming the international financial system: stepping up international cooperation in financial regulation; advancing reform of international financial institutions; encouraging regional financial cooperation; and improving the international currency system. Foreign ministry spokesman Qin Gang said the agreement was "comprehensive, positive and balanced"
- (France) – After the meeting, French President Nicolas Sarkozy said: "For the first time, countries as different as those at this G20 in the United States have reached agreement on the principles, the procedures for action and on an ambitious action plan."
- (Germany) – German Chancellor Angela Merkel said that the stalled Doha round of global trade talks should be pushed forward so that a basic agreement could be reached before President Bush leaves office in January.
- (India) – Indian Prime Minister Dr. Manmohan Singh welcomed the summit "for the first time there was a genuine dialogue between many of the developed countries and the emerging economies" He also added that the summit was "a clear indication that the balance of power is shifting in favour of emerging economies".
- – Japanese Prime Minister Taro Aso spoke about the impact on the poorer countries if nothing is done, how to avoid it, and how to help them. 12 out of 15 plans written by Aso (Based on so called Aso-plan, sent to New York Times) ended up on the final agreement. Including Japan funding IMF with 100 billion dollars. This had led other countries to put in larger sums of funds, thus stabilizing the safety net for the countries in need financially. This is believed to have stopped the total collapse of world economy from the 2008 financial crisis.
- – President of South Korea Lee Myung-bak said "G20 nations must lead the way for the stalled WTO Doha Agreement to be concluded as soon as possible" And He made keynote speech at G20 summit that G20 countries make a "Stand-Still" declaration on trade and investment restrictions.
- (United Kingdom) – British Prime Minister Gordon Brown spoke at a press conference: "These are extraordinary times and they require extraordinary measures." "If my sense of last night is right, at a next meeting, plans for the detailed reform of international institutions will be brought forward", he said after the meeting.
- – President of the United States George W. Bush said: "We are adapting our financial systems to the realities of the 21st century". VOA reported that after the summit Bush stated: "Our nations agreed that we must make the financial markets more transparent and accountable. Transparency is very important so that investors and regulators are able to know the truth."
- (European Union) – President of the European Commission José Manuel Barroso was pleased with the outcome of the summit: 'I can really say that this was a historic summit. I am very, very happy.' He added that no one had expected a miracle solution, emphasising that there was now a 'clear time schedule' for reforming the world financial system. 'This is the beginning of a process, not the end,' he explained.

==== From the press ====
The financial press generally welcomed the results of the summit but the Financial Times drew attention to the need for real global cooperation on the ambitious agenda while The Wall Street Journal questioned whether the "regulatory crackdown on the kind of high-risk lending and investment that has led the world into a financial mess" might not backfire by causing an unwanted credit crunch. Business Week listed a number of difficult fundamental questions finance ministers would now have to resolve by the end of March. These included trade tensions and protectionism, consumer spending, housing prices, a clampdown on lending practices and how to achieve global coordination. The Hindu's Business Line opined that "it is all very well to speak blithely of new Bretton Woods institutions but, when there is no acceptance of a world mediated by Western ideas, the move is doomed ab initio."

== Similar efforts ==
The UN General Assembly set up an Interactive Panel on the Global Financial Crisis which held its first meeting in New York on 30 October 2008, led by Professor Joseph Stiglitz. It covered similar ground as the G20, but involving a broader range of countries, and lobbied for an agreement involving all members of the UN. The panel's work was carried forward by a Commission of Experts on Reform of the International Financial System, also led by Stiglitz.

== See also ==
- 2008 financial crisis
- Eurodad
- Exchange rate regime
- Foreign exchange reserves
- List of G20 summits
