= Zag Bank =

- Type: Subsidiary
- Industry: Banking
- Founded: 2002
- Defunct: 2019
- Headquarters: Calgary, Alberta
- Products: Financial services
- Number of employees: 66
- Parent: Desjardins Group
- Website: www.zagbank.ca

Zag Bank was a Canadian direct bank owned by Desjardins Group. Zag was founded as Bank West in High River, Alberta in 2002 and acquired by Desjardins in 2011 along with the other Western Financial Group companies. Desjardins announced on 5 November 2018 the winding down of operations for Zag Bank effective 2019.

== History ==
The Western Financial Group initially focused on insurance consolidation, but expanded into banking in 2002, when Bank West was established. The bank maintained offices in High River and Winnipeg.

The bank acquired Ubiquity Bank in November 2007 and Agrifinancial in February 2009. In 2010, Western Financial was acquired by the Desjardins Group and the transaction was completed in 2011. In 2014, the Desjardins Group changed the name of Bank West to Zag Bank.

On 5 November 2018, Zag Bank announced the end of all remaining operations by the second quarter of 2019.

== See also ==
- List of Canadian banks
