= Nonperson =

Nonperson may refer to:

- Not a real person
- A person whose presence is not acknowledged during social interactions, see "nonperson treatment"
- The status of a fetus before the acknowledging of the beginning of human personhood in it

== See also ==
- Unperson
