= Desjardins Group =

Canadian association of credit unions

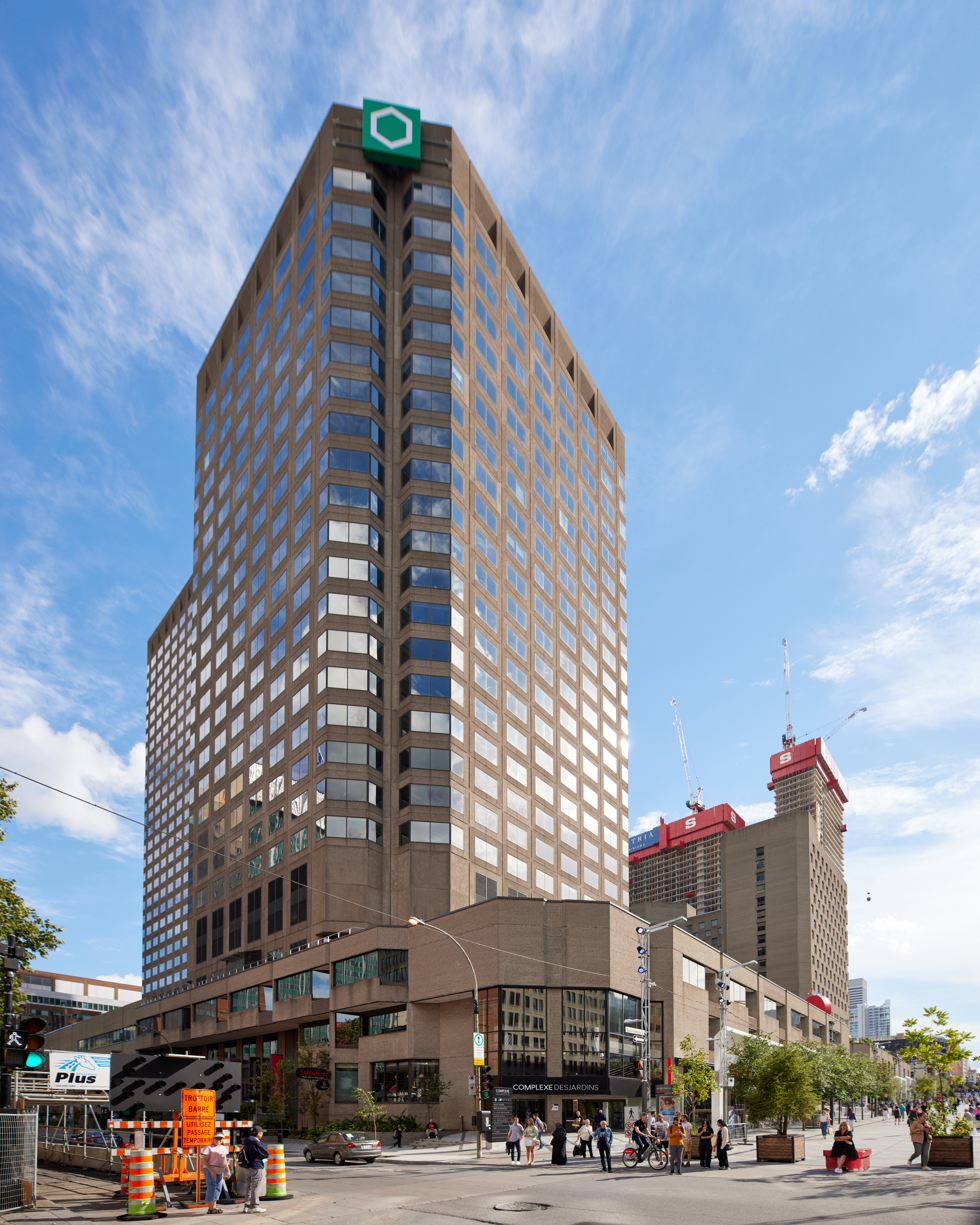
- The Complexe Desjardins in Montreal
- Type: Cooperative
- Industry: Financial services
- Founded: 6 December 1900 in Lévis, Quebec
- Headquarters: Lévis, Quebec, Canada
- Key people: Denis Dubois, President & Chief Executive Officer, Alphonse Desjardins, co-founder
- Products: Banking, checking accounts, insurance, stock brokerage, investment banking, asset-based lending, consumer finance
- Revenue: ▼ Can$20.32 billion (2021)
- Net income: ▲ Can$3.53 billion (2021)
- AUM: ▲ Can$91.26 billion (2021)
- Total assets: ▲ Can$397.09 billion (2021)
- Total equity: ▲ Can$33.53 billion (2021)
- Number of employees: ▲53,783 (FTE, 2021)
- Website: desjardins.com

The Desjardins Group (French: Mouvement Desjardins, pronounced [muvmɑ̃ deʒaʁdɛ̃]) is a Canadian financial service cooperative and the largest federation of credit unions (French: caisses populaires) in North America. It was founded on December 6, 1900 in Lévis, Quebec by Alphonse Desjardins. While its legal headquarters remains in Lévis, most of the executive management, including the CEO, is based in Montreal.

As of 2017, Desjardins Group consists of 293 local credit unions operating 1,032 points of service and serving more than seven million members and clients, mostly in the provinces of Quebec and Ontario. Desjardins Group also operates the services of the former Canadian division of State Farm which was then acquired in 2015.

In addition to retail banking, the Group has over twenty subsidiaries offering products and services related to insurance (Desjardins Financial Security, Desjardins General Insurance), real estate (with its Complexe Desjardins offices in Montreal and Quebec online estate agent DuProprio), venture capital funds (Desjardins Venture Capital), and brokerage (Desjardins Securities). The Desjardins Group, through subsidiary Développement international Desjardins, is also active in over 30 developing countries through technical assistance programs and various investments. In October 2020, Desjardins launched a social impact fund, Aequitas, which could grow to 115 million dollars and help women and youth in developing countries.

== History ==
After studying European credit institutions established in the 19th century, Alphonse Desjardins in 1901 came up with an original solution adapted to North America.

In the late 1990s, the number of caisses was reduced from 1275 to 800.

Between 2008 and 2010, total assets at Desjardins Group grew over 15% from Can$151.9 billion (when it ranked sixth in Canada and first in Quebec among financial institutions ahead of the National Bank of Canada) to over $175 billion in 2010. In 2006, it had 6,500 elected and volunteer officers and employed over 40,000 people and gave its members $483 million in patronage allocations and $64 million in donations, sponsorships and academic scholarships. Most of the latter sum was used on regional economic development and health programs as well. In that same year, in March 2008, the election of Monique Leroux at the head of the group marked the history of Canada by becoming "Canada's largest company headed by a woman".

In December 2010, it acquired the 121 offices and 500,000 customers of Western Financial for $443 million, giving it a presence in British Columbia, Alberta, Saskatchewan, and Manitoba.

In 2003, Desjardins bought the former Province of Ontario Savings Office, which it branded Desjardins Credit Union and operated until 2011. This institution was then merged into Meridian Credit Union. (The similarly named Desjardins Ontario Credit Union, formed 1 January 2020 with the merger of 11 Ontario Desjardins-affiliated credit unions and their federation into one, is not the same entity and continues as a going concern.)

In 2014, Desjardins Group acquired the Canadian operations of U.S.-based insurance giant State Farm. The policies were transferred to be underwritten by Desjardins Insurance on January 1, 2015. The State Farm brand continued to be used for agents and marketing until 2018.

On January 3, 2017, Desjardins Group announced the closing of the sale of its pet health insurance company, Western Financial Insurance Company to Economical Mutual Insurance Company. Western Financial Insurance Company and its flagship brand, Petsecure were purchased in 2011 as part of the Western Financial Group deal.

On July 5, 2017, Trimont Financial, a wholly owned subsidiary of the Wawanesa Mutual Insurance Company, announced the completion of its purchase of the remainder of Western Financial Group from Desjardins Group for $775 million. Included in the sale were Western Financial Group's Brokerage Network, Western Financial Group Insurance Solutions, and Western Life Assurance.

In 2018, State Farm Canada was officially rebranded to Desjardins Insurance through Desjardins Insurance Agents. The whole transition was to be completed by the end of 2019.

=== 2019 data breach ===
On June 20, 2019, Desjardins Group reported a data breach involving personal data of 4.3 million individual users and 173,000 businesses, more than 40% of Quebec-based credit union's clients and members. The security breach, detected in December 2018, was not linked to a direct cyberattack, but the result of a disgruntled corporate employee. The data leaked was assembled over a certain period of time after unauthorized access to banking systems and copied customer data. Police investigation is still ongoing.

== Credit agency ratings ==
As of December 2018, Desjardins long-term debt is rated Aa2 by Moody's, A+ by S&P, AA by DBRS, and AA− by Fitch. S&P and Fitch considered the company's outlook "stable," while Moody's and DBRS rated it "negative."

== See also ==
- Desjardins (disambiguation)
- Mouvement des caisses populaires acadiennes, New Brunswick, is inspired by Desjardins
- List of banks and credit unions in Canada
