= Group insurance =

Insurance that covers a defined group of people

Group insurance is an insurance that covers a group of people, for example the members of a society or professional association, or the employees of a particular employer for the purpose of taking insurance. Group coverage can help reduce the problem of adverse selection by creating a pool of people eligible to purchase insurance who belong to the group for reasons other than the wish to buy insurance. Grouping individuals together allows insurance companies to give lower rates to companies, "Providing large volume of business to insurance companies gives us greater bargaining power for clients, resulting in cheaper group rates." The concept varies internationally, with distinct practices and benefits in different countries, such as Canada and India. Additionally, group insurance policies can be either compulsory or voluntary, each with specific underwriting requirements and implications for coverage and premiums.

== Overview and benefits ==
Group insurance may offer life insurance, health insurance, and/or some other types of personal insurance.

== Characteristics ==
Investopedia defines group life insurance as "Life insurance offered by an employer or large-scale entity (i.e. association or labor organization) to its workers or members. " Group life insurance is typically offered as a piece of a larger employer or membership benefit package. By purchasing coverage through a provider on a 'wholesale' basis for its members, the coverage costs each individual worker/member much less than the purchase of an individual policy. People who elect coverage through the group policy receive a 'certificate of credible coverage' useful in obtaining subsequent coverage, if necessary from another insurance.

Thus we can infer the following characteristics of group life insurance, which also apply to other group insurances:

- There must be a group of people to be insured who have something in common other than the purpose of obtaining insurance.
- There is often a master policy holder who will retain the documentation on behalf of the members, and may deal with the members on behalf of the insurer.
- Group rates are cheaper than individual rates, as administration and expected claims costs are lower.

=== Types of insurable groups ===
Insurable Groups can broadly be classified as mainly two types - " employer - employee " groups where all members work for the employer proposing to cover them or "affinity" groups, whose members have a commonality other than employment - say deposit holders of a bank.

== Role of the master policy holder ==
The master policy holder of a group life insurance plan in the case of an "Employer Employee Group" is basically the Employer and for other groups would be the entity that has an insurable interest in the lives of its members. A bank it could be said has an insurable interest in the lives of its members who hold a deposit or have taken a loan. The master policy holder also ensures each member gets a certificate of coverage stating the details of the premium paid, cover available, term of the cover and the claims process.

== Pricing structure and premiums ==
A feature which is common in group insurance is that the premium cost on an individual basis is not individually risk-based. Instead it is the same amount for all the insured persons in the group. So, for example, in the United States and elsewhere, often all employees of an employer receiving health or life insurance coverage pay the same premium amount for the same coverage regardless of their age or other factors, even though the total group premium will be calculated by reference to the actual (or estimated) age distribution etc. of the group. In contrast, under private individual health or life insurance coverage in the U.S. and elsewhere, different insured persons will pay different premium amounts for the same coverage based on their age, location, pre-existing conditions, etc.

Group policies may be attractive to consumers because the average price per policy is often lower. Carriers are interested in gaining customers and will cut prices a bit to take account of their lower costs.

Members who take up the insurance are generally eligible to renew coverage while they continue to be members of the group, subject to certain conditions. Again, using U.S. health coverage as an example, under group insurance a person will normally remain covered as long as he or she continues to work for a certain employer and pays the required insurance premiums, whereas under individual coverage, the insurance company often has the right not to renew an individual health insurance policy if the person's risk profile changes. However some states limit the insurance company's power not to renew after the person has been under individual coverage with a given company for a certain number of years.

== International variations ==
There may be slight differences in terms of administration and market related practices worldwide, even though the concept may be the same.

=== Australia ===
In Australia, MySuper insurance, also called Default Life Insurance, is group life insurance coverage arranged by Australian superannuation trustees for their members. Most MySuper products automatically include death and total and permanent disability (TPD) insurance, allowing members to withdraw or adjust their coverage. APRA has observed that most Australians obtain life insurance through their superannuation fund.

=== Canada ===
In Canada, group insurance is usually purchased through larger brokerage firms because brokers receive better rates than individual companies or unions.

=== India ===
In India, broker procured group term insurance does not necessarily have any price advantage to the buyer, i.e., the master policy holder.

Group health insurance plans provided in India are generally uniform in nature, offering the same benefits to all employees or members of the group. However, they can be customized to offer benefits by designation and profile of employees. Most professionally run companies today provide group health insurance as a part of their Employee Welfare programs. Each company, however, gets the plan customized based on the employee demographics. Typically in India, companies use broker services to design their plan and negotiate with insurance companies. One specific advantage that group plans have over retail plans in India is that the group plans provide day one cover for pre-existing diseases while the retail plans have one to four years waiting period.

== Compulsory vs. voluntary coverage ==
Group life insurance covers may be either compulsory – in which case no member can opt out of the insurance – or voluntary, where each eligible member may decide within a given time limit whether or not to be included in the group insurance. This is irrespective of who pays the premium.

== Underwriting requirements ==
Since compulsory cover offers much less scope for adverse selection, it is subject to much more relaxed underwriting requirements than voluntary covers. Underwriting requirements even for voluntary group life cover are far less onerous than for similar insurance on individual lives. However, the assessment criteria for group life insurance cover is more strict in comparison to individual coverage. It is easier to qualify for benefits under individual cover than group cover at claim stage. This is because group benefit covers a wider range of people without medical examinations and group cover offers less scope for adverse selection.

== See also ==
- Group Life Insurance
