= Credit insurance =

Credit insurance refers to several kinds of insurance relating to financial credit:

- Trade credit insurance, purchased by businesses to insure payment of credit extended by the business
- Payment protection insurance, purchased by consumers to insure payment of credit extended to the consumer
- Credit derivative, financial instrument or technique designed to separate and then transfer the credit risk of an underlying loan
