= State Farm Downtown Building =

- U.S. National Register of Historic Places
- U.S. Historic district – Contributing property
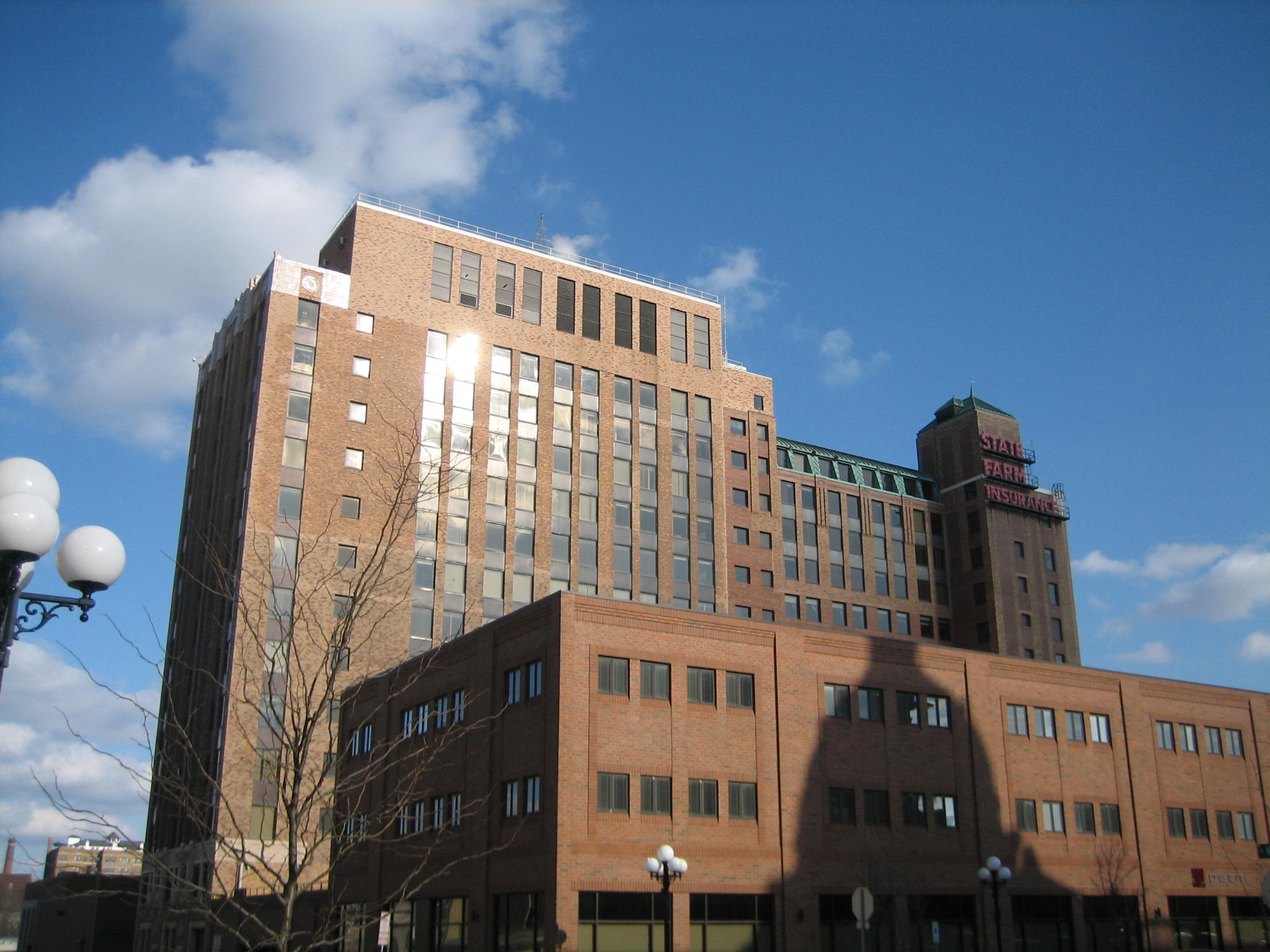
- State Farm Downtown Building, 2007

- Location within Illinois Location within the United States
- Location: 112 E. Washington St., Bloomington, Illinois
- Coordinates: 40°28′48″N 88°59′33″W
- Built: 1929-1947
- Architect: Archie Schaeffer and Phillip Hooton
- Architectural style: Art Deco
- NRHP reference No.: 85000363
- Added to NRHP: February 28, 1985

The State Farm Downtown Building, variously known as the State Farm Insurance Building or the State Farm Fire Building, is an Art Deco building in downtown Bloomington, Illinois. It served as the corporate headquarters for State Farm Insurance from its construction until 1974.

== History ==
The first eight-floor section of the building (the south portion) was constructed in 1929. In 1934, an additional four floors and a penthouse were added. Five years later, State Farm acquired the property directly to the north of the lot the Downtown Building was constructed on. That property originally held the Odd Fellows lodge and, after acquisition, State Farm demolished the property's original structure. From 1939 to 1940 the company constructed the eight-floor south portion of the Downtown Building complex. In 1945, another five stories were added to the original eight floors of the north addition. With construction finished, the complex served as State Farm's corporate headquarters until 1974.

State Farm moved the last of its employees from the building in January 2018, and in April 2018 announced its intention to permanently leave the 200,000 square foot building. Having failed to find a buyer, in July 2019 State Farm announced that it would be demolishing the building.

In October 2019, whether because residents expressed concern about the potential loss of the art deco building or the cost of demolishing was more than donating, State Farm transferred its former downtown headquarters for less than $100 to a developer who expressed plans for a $40 million renovation.

== Architecture ==
The State Farm Downtown Building was designed by Archie Schaeffer and Phillip Hooton. Their firm, Schaeffer and Hooton, was one of two offshoots of the local firm of Arthur Pillsbury after he was killed in a car accident. The 162-foot (49 m) building is an example of Art Deco architecture, though the decorative nature of the building is atypical among examples of the style. The original south portion of the tower features a large sign on its west facade that reads: "State Farm Insurance". The sign's letters stand five and a half feet tall and since February 18, 1935 the sign has been electrically illuminated. The steel-framed building has facades clad in light brown brick and features curtain walls that hang from the frame. The second story belt course features stonework including stone light fixtures. The building's cornice features more stonework and large medallions. The stonework throughout the building is cast in a variety of stone types that include pygmatic gneiss and dolomite. The Art Deco medallions are a repeating theme of the structure's facade.

The company's founder, George Mecherle, moved into an office on the Downtown Building's eighth floor in 1940. Since 1951, the office has been left intact by the company. State Farm's historian claims that "90% of Mecherle's original material is still in the office." Inside the office are sales receipts dating to 1936 and guest book entries from 1945. Though the office is not open to the public, the company uses it to impart knowledge of the company's past to new employees.

== Historic significance ==
The building is listed as a contributing property to the National Register of Historic Places listed Bloomington Central Business District, a historic district encompassing much of downtown Bloomington, Illinois.
