= Michael L. Tipsord =

American businessman (b. 1959)

- Born: June 20, 1959 (age 67)
- Education: Illinois Wesleyan University (BS); University of Illinois at Urbana-Champaign (JD)

Michael L. Tipsord (born June 20, 1959) is the chairman of the board of State Farm Insurance in Bloomington, Illinois. Tipsord replaced Edward B. Rust Jr. as chairman on September 1, 2015. State Farm is the 42nd largest company in the United States on the Fortune 500 and the country’s largest auto and home insurer.

== Education ==
Tipsord was born and raised in Illinois, graduated with a BS degree summa cum laude in 1981, from Illinois Wesleyan University in Bloomington, and a JD degree in 1984 magna cum laude from the University of Illinois at Urbana-Champaign.

== Career ==
Tipsord is a registered Certified Public Accountant (CPA) and is a registered attorney in Illinois since November 16, 1984. Tipsord earned the Chartered Life Underwriter (CLU) designation in 1991 and the Chartered Property Casualty Underwriter (CPCU) in 1995.

Tipsord was a private practice attorney before becoming an assistant tax counsel for State Farm in 1988. Tipsord has gone on to hold a number of leadership positions including assistant treasurer in 1998, VP in 2001, senior vice president and CFO in 2004, COO before becoming chief executive officer in 2015. Tipsord’s compensation from State Farm was $24.5 million in 2021.

State Farm announced in December 2023 that Tipsord will be retiring as the company's president in 2024.

== Other involvements ==
Tipsord serves as a trustee for the Brookings Institution think tank, the dean’s advisory board for the University of Illinois College of Law, the board of Navagant Consulting, and has been a featured speaker at the Wharton School of Business.

== Controversies ==
Since Tipsord became CEO, State Farm has gone from nearly 70,000 employees to 53,586 employees in 2021. Since 2015, numerous locations have been closed. Five more office centers are slated to close in 2020 and 2021.

Also under Tipsord, State Farm has announced their Green Mission to "lead by example" in environmental philanthropy. However, Ceres found that State Farm invests billions of US dollars to finance fossil fuel companies. Others place State Farm's fossil fuel investments at US $22.4 billion. State Farm has not considered climate change as a factor when investing.
