= Merna, Illinois =

- Unincorporated community
- Location within Illinois Location within the United States
- Coordinates: 40°31′00″N 88°49′33″W
- Country: United States
- State: Illinois
- County: McLean
- Elevation: 810 ft (250 m)
- Time zone: UTC-6 (Central (CST))
  - Summer (DST): UTC-5 (CDT)
- ZIP code: 61761
- Area code: 309
- GNIS feature ID: 413436

Merna is an unincorporated community in McLean County, Illinois, United States. Merna is 9 miles (14 km) east-northeast of downtown Bloomington. Merna formerly had a post office with ZIP code 61758, which was closed in the mid-2000s .

== Notable person ==
- George J. Mecherle, founder of State Farm Insurance
