= Curley "Boo" Johnson =

Harlem Globetrotters player

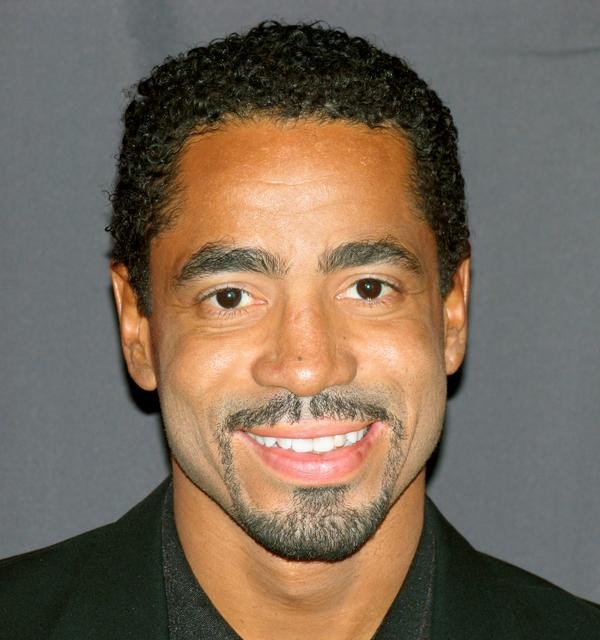

Personal information
- Born: February 10, 1965 Peoria, Illinois, U.S.

Career information
- College: Loras College

Curley "Boo" Johnson (born February 10, 1965) is an American basketball player, best known as a member of the Harlem Globetrotters, an American exhibition basketball team.

== Family ==
Johnson is from Peoria, Illinois, and is the son of Lorraine and Curley Johnson Sr. Johnson Sr. was the first Black player to play basketball for Bradley University, leading them to a National Invitation Tournament championship in 1957.

== Early years ==
Curley "Boo" Johnson moved to Peoria, Illinois, in 1970 at age 4. He played for Sterling Grade School, coached by Robert Snowden, which placed fourth in the city championships. Johnson also played tailback in football for the Sterling Lions JFL when the team won an undefeated city championship.

He played football, basketball, and baseball at Richwoods High School for two years and then transferred to Peoria High School. While he was a member, the latter's basketball team held a 38–18 record and received regional and sectional titles, and consecutive fourth-place finishes in the 1980 & 1981 Illinois State Classic Holiday Tournaments (now named the State Farm Holiday Classic).

== College years ==
=== Spoon River College 1982–83 ===
When playing for Spoon River College, Johnson scored 19 points in his first game against Richland College and led the state of Illinois and tied for seventh in the country for field goal percentage, shooting a 65.7% record that still stands. SRC won the sectional title and set a school record for wins (26), with a 4th-place finish in the state. Johnson went 3 consecutive games without missing a field goal. He was named McDonald's Cage Classic all-tournament, all-section, all-region, and 4th team Sporting News NJCAA All-American.

=== Muscatine Community College 1983–1984 ===
Johnson played one season for the Muscatine Community College Indians.

=== Loras College 1984–87 ===
When Johnson played at Loras College, coach Mike Jaskulski was quoted as saying that Johnson was the finest ball handler and dribbler he ever coached or saw play at Loras. Johnson earned a degree in marketing. Loras retired Johnson's #14 jersey on December 10, 1999.

== Harlem Globetrotters ==
Johnson was discovered by Globetrotters' general manager, Joe Anzivino, and invited to training camp in Los Angeles in fall 1988. He became the marquee dribbler and held that position for 18 consecutive seasons, from 1988 to 2007, playing 4210 games. He toured 81 countries on all seven continents. Johnson was part of the group that visited Pope John Paul II on November 29, 2000, in Rome. As a Globetrotter, he met Mother Teresa and President of South Africa Nelson Mandela. Johnson was a member of the team that participated in the enshrinement ceremony when the Globetrotters were inducted into the Naismith Memorial Basketball Hall of Fame in 2002.

== Awards ==
- Harlem Globetrotters Team Captain Legacy Award 1996
- Mr. Globetrotter Award 1998, 1999
- Loras College Jersey Number Retirement 1999
- Ambassador Award 1999
- Peoria High Sports Hall of Fame 2004
- Peoria Area Sports Hall of Fame 2007
- Peoria African American Hall of Fame 2007
- Spoon River College Sports Hall of Fame 2010
- Loras College Honorary Degree 2018

== Personal life ==
Johnson lives in Scottsdale, Arizona, with his wife, Michelle, and stepson, Troy.
