= Illinois Wesleyan University =

Private college in Bloomington, Illinois, US

Coordinates: 40°29′26″N 88°59′29″W

- Motto: Scientia et Sapientia (Latin)
- Motto in English: Knowledge and Wisdom
- Type: Private liberal arts college
- Established: 1850; 176 years ago
- Endowment: $198.9 million (2020)
- President: Sheahon Zenger
- Faculty: 175
- Administrative staff: 300
- Undergraduates: 1,527 (fall 2022)
- Location: Bloomington, Illinois, United States
- Campus: Suburban 82 acres (324,000 m^{2})
- Colors: Green White
- Nickname: Titans
- Sporting affiliations: NCAA Division III – CCIW
- Website: iwu.edu

Illinois Wesleyan University is a private liberal arts college in Bloomington, Illinois, United States. Founded in 1850, the central portion of the present campus was acquired in 1854 with the first building erected in 1856.

== History ==
The institution was founded in 1850 as a private four-year college in Bloomington, Illinois.

The university's first international students, Y. Osawa and K. Tanaka, arrived from Japan in 1889.

Illinois Wesleyan's College of Liberal Arts was formally organized in 1906, and the College of Fine Arts – combining schools of art, music, and theatre arts – was established in 1948.

Illinois Wesleyan offered nursing study in conjunction with the Brokaw School of Nursing beginning in 1923, and in 1959 established the IWU School of Nursing with a four-year baccalaureate program.

IWU operated a School of Law from 1873 to 1928.

The institution's board of trustees took formal action to invite black students to enroll at Illinois Wesleyan in 1867 and women in 1870. The first female graduate, Hannah I. Shur, received her diploma in 1872. Gus A. Hill was the first African-American graduate, earning a law degree in 1880.

In November 2021, the American Association of University Professors sanctioned Illinois Wesleyan for violating standards of academic governance when it discontinued the anthropology, French, Italian, and religious studies programs and announced plans to fire six tenured faculty members.

== Academics ==
Illinois Wesleyan is an independent, residential university with an approximate enrollment of 1,527. It offers over 42 majors, minors and programs. Its most popular majors, based on number out of 381 graduates in 2022, were:

- Registered Nursing (53)
- Business (36)
- Psychology (31)
- Finance (28)
- Biology/Biological Sciences (26)

The university maintains a student/faculty ratio of 11 to 1, with an average class size of 16 More than 9 in 10 IWU students receive a scholarship or need-based assistance. Illinois Wesleyan is also a member of the Annapolis Group and has chapters in the prestigious Phi Beta Kappa and Phi Kappa Phi honor societies.

The university consists of the College of Liberal Arts, which includes the School of Business and Economics; the College of Fine Arts that includes three professional schools—the Ames School of Art & Design, School of Music and the School of Theatre Arts; and the School of Nursing & Health Sciences. Illinois Wesleyan's campus occupies approximately 82 acres (330,000 m^{2}) a short walk north from downtown Bloomington in central Illinois.

Bachelor's degree programs are offered in three colleges:

- College of Liberal Arts: organized in 1906
- College of Fine Arts: schools of art, music, and theatre arts organized in 1929, 1946, 1947 respectively
- School of Nursing & Health Sciences: established in 1959

=== Ames Library ===
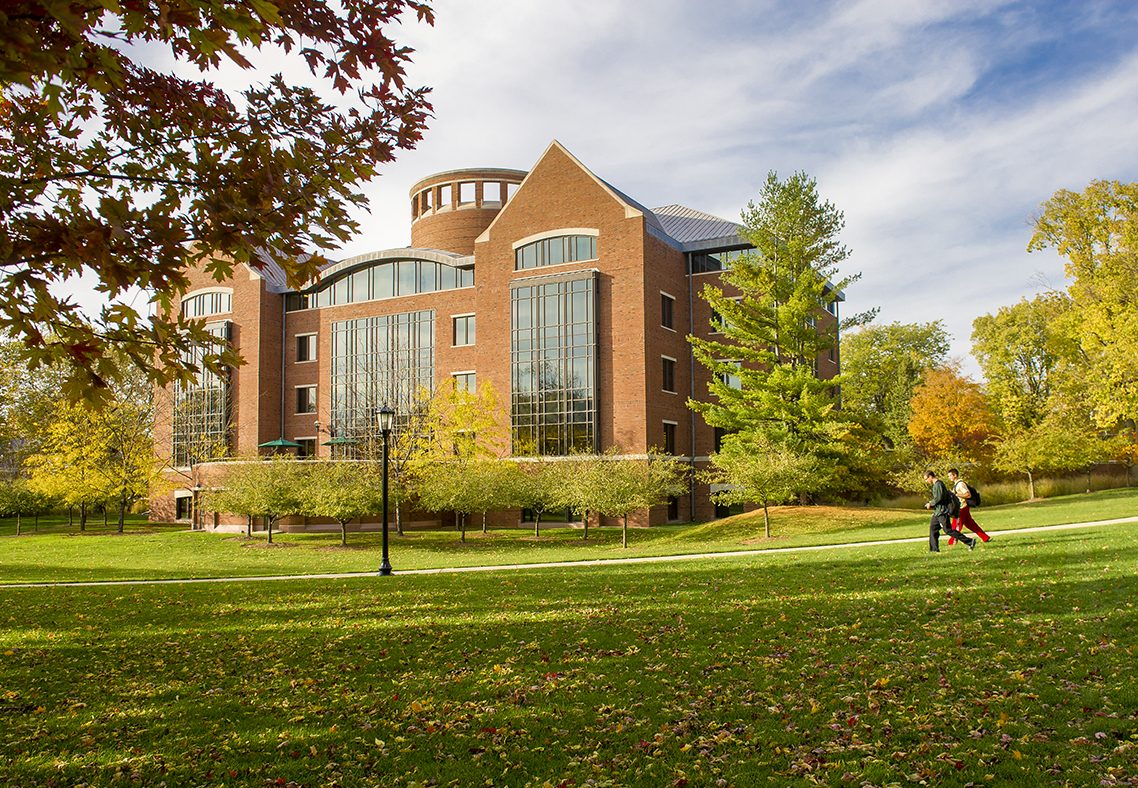
The Ames Library

Illinois Wesleyan's Ames Library was completed in 2002. It contains over 368,000 volumes spread over five floors. The Ames Library also houses eight sets of stained glass panels originally from Pembroke College at Oxford University. The library also contains an extensive art collection that is on display throughout the building, featuring both student pieces of work as well as pieces made by famous artists like Pablo Picasso, Salvador Dalí, Utagawa Hiroshige, Arrah Lee Gaul, Leroy Neiman, Frederick Hart, and Rembrandt. Among the special collections are the papers of former U.S. Representative Leslie C. Arends; the Gernon collection of first editions of detective fiction and mysteries; and the Schultz collection of 18th- and 19th-century British drama, including The Beggar's Opera. Construction cost $25.7 million; Shepley Bulfinch Richardson and Abbot were the principal architects.

=== May Term ===
Illinois Wesleyan offers a May Term course option. The university refers to it as a 4–4–1 system. This allows any student who has completed a full course-load in either the spring or fall semesters of that academic year to enroll in a May Term class.

May Term classes last approximately three weeks during the month of May. Students take several hours of instruction in the same course each day for five days each week. This allows the students to immerse themselves in that one topic. At the end of the May Term a student completes the equivalent of a single course during one semester.

May Term emphasizes curricular experimentation, and also offers an opportunity for service projects, study abroad, and internships.

=== Study abroad ===
Illinois Wesleyan offers a number of study abroad opportunities, and ranks in the top 40 schools in the nation for students studying abroad. IWU's International Office provides support for over 300 global Study Abroad Options in 70 countries through various institutes such as IES and SIT Study Abroad. Domestically, IWU offers a UN semester, a Washington Semester, and the Associated Colleges of the Midwest Chicago Program. Internationally it offers programs in London and Barcelona. It also maintains a very strong relationship with Pembroke College, Oxford, and traditionally a few juniors can spend a year there as exchange students.

=== Research ===
The university publishes several different undergraduate research journals in the fields of political science, economics, history, and English. Perhaps the first of its kind, the Undergraduate Economic Review is a student-managed, open access journal that has published original undergraduate content from students in the U.S. and at least 15 other countries.

The John Wesley Powell Student Research Conference was established in 1990 to provide opportunities for students to present research projects and findings in a public and interactive manner. The Action Research Center was established in 2004 to partner student research and service projects with the wider Illinois community.

== Athletics ==
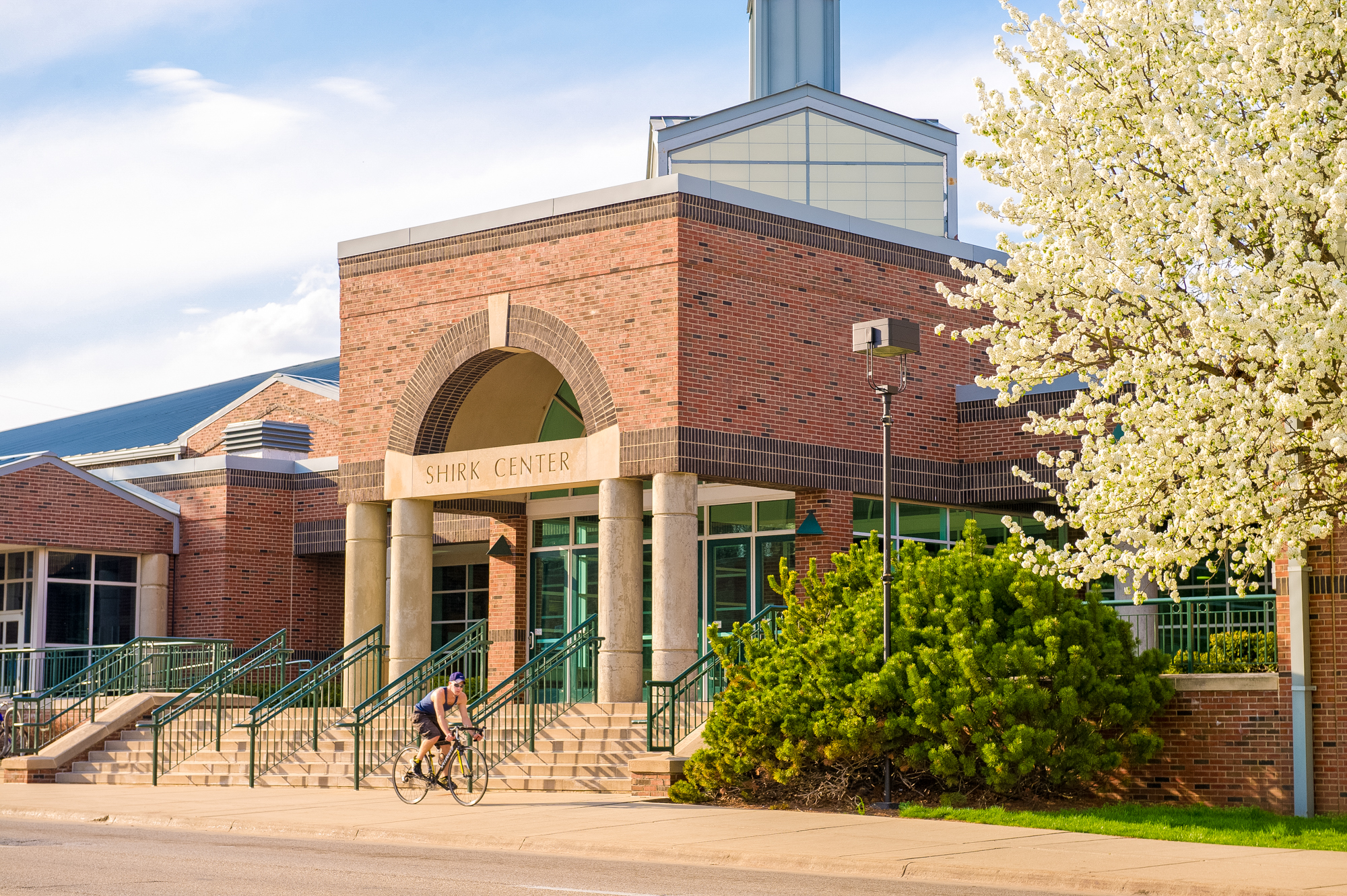
Shirk Center at Illinois Wesleyan University

Illinois Wesleyan University participates in the NCAA's Division III and is a member of the College Conference of Illinois and Wisconsin (CCIW). Illinois Wesleyan teams have won 136 CCIW Titles and 9 Division III National Championships. Illinois Wesleyan has produced 135 Academic All-American student athletes since the program began in 1970, a total that is tied for 25th among all participating colleges and universities, regardless of NCAA division.

Illinois Wesleyan University's Division III athletic teams, known as the "Titans," helped found the College Conference of Illinois and Wisconsin (CCIW) in 1946. Illinois Wesleyan was a member of the Illinois Intercollegiate Athletic Conference from 1910 to 1937.

The Titans have 22 varsity teams, 11 men's and 11 women's, with the addition of men's and women's lacrosse in 2014 and 2015, respectively.

=== Shirk Center ===
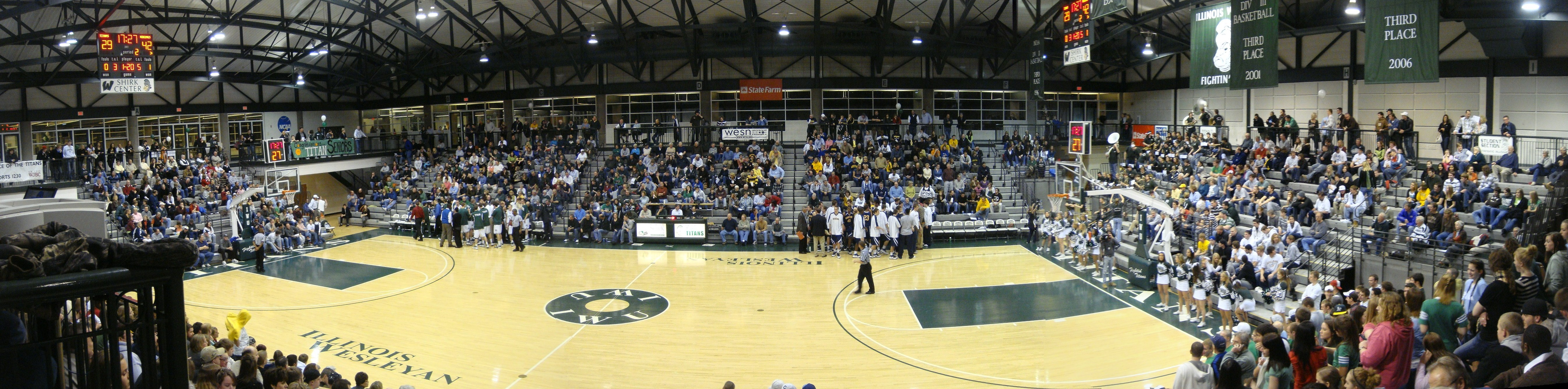
Shirk Center

Shirk Center is the university's athletic complex. The two-story 135,000-square-foot (12,500 m^{2}) complex was constructed in 1994. A 20,000-square-foot expansion was opened in 2016. The Shirk complex provides a multi-use facility for squash, tennis, basketball, and other indoor sports. It also houses Fort Natorium, the university's swimming center, as well as classrooms and a six-lane, 200-meter track. The Shirk Center also hosted the 2010 & 2011 NCAA Division III Women's National Basketball Championships. The "Shirk" is also the championship venue for the annual State Farm Holiday Classic, one of the largest, coed high school holiday basketball tournaments in the nation, as well as the Heart of Illinois Conference basketball tournament in mid-January.

=== Division III NCAA National championships ===
- Men's
  - Basketball – 1997
  - Baseball – 2010
  - Golf – 2019, 2021
- Women's
  - Indoor track & field – 2008
  - Outdoor track & field – 2008, 2010, 2016
  - Basketball – 2012

== Campus life ==
The university and Student Senate regularly bring speakers and comedians to campus. There are regularly organized social events both on and off-campus. Faculty colloquia regularly provide opportunities for intellectual discussion and encouragement. The campus itself is an arboretum, home to over 1,000 trees from 90 different species.

=== Residential living and community ===
All halls are co-ed, all residence hall rooms have cable television and wireless Internet, and the vast majority of rooms are two/three-person units. Dodds Hall offers eight-person suites and Harriet Fuller Rust House offers four-person and six-person suites as well as two eight-person two-story townhouse style suites. Traditional style living is offered in Magill Hall and Pfeiffer Hall. First-year students live in first-year halls: Gulick Hall, Munsell Hall, and Ferguson Hall. Illinois Wesleyan also offers two themed housing communities: Kemp Hall (the International House) and Blackstock Hall (the Arts House). Nearly one-third of the campus community is involved and/or resides in one of five fraternities or four sororities. Students may also live in the Gates (est. 2013), and the East Street Apartments (est. 2006), which are modern, apartment-style residences that students can sign as leases.

=== Campus activities and organizations ===
There are 200 student organizations at Wesleyan, ranging from the rock-climbing club, the Anime club, to Pi Kappa Lambda (the music honors society). The national fraternity Tau Kappa Epsilon was founded on campus in 1899.

=== Campus folklore ===
Illinois Wesleyan has many ghost stories that have emerged from the student body and historic buildings. One such legend is the "The Lady in Red" who is said to haunt Kemp Hall (the International House) dormitory, and is featured in the 2026 PBS station WTVP documentary Haunted Heartland. Streetcar tycoon A.E. DeMange originally had Kemp Hall built as a mansion for him and his wife, Mary Louise Hodge DeMange. Finished in 1907, the legend is that Mrs. DeMange died just a year later, causing the grief stricken Mr. DeMange to sell the house to Illinois Wesleyan University in 1911. Since then, student publications, local newspapers and oral storytelling have told stories of unexplained phenomena inside the house and alleged encounters with Mrs. DeMange's ghost. No alleged interaction has documented the spirit as harming anyone, instead just that she still inhabits the house. She is said to sometimes appear in a red ballgown, earning the nickname "The Lady in Red." There are also accounts of her appearing in mirrors of the house, mysterious footsteps on the stairs, electrical appliances turning on my themselves, and walls of static interrupting broadcasts of the student radio station, WESN 88.1 FM, which is located in the basement of Kemp Hall. Students have stated that the unexplained static that interrupts the radio is the indication of her presence in the room, and that there was at one time a procedural checklist that existed which stated what to say or do to appease her, in order to resume the broadcast.

In the mid-2000s the student filmmaking organization, 9x9, made the documentary Myths and Legends at IWU, which explored four supposedly haunted location on campus. The film was broadcast on Titan TV and is now digital archived by Illinois Wesleyan.

The history student organization, Historia Society, gives annual ghost tours in late October, visiting multiple locations of alleged hauntings.

=== Lectures and speakers ===
Illinois Wesleyan co-hosts the annual Stevenson Lecture Series, initiated in 1965 as a memorial to former Governor Adlai Stevenson. IWU co-hosts the Lecture Series with Illinois State University.

Martin Luther King Jr. spoke at the university twice, in 1961 and 1966. In 1966 he came to the university while he was trying to organize in Chicago. There, he said,

And I still have faith in America because I love America and I believe that we will continue to build a coalition of conscience that one day will solve this problem. We sing a little song in our movement and it has been our guiding faith. Sometimes we’ve been facing hooded perpetrators of violence; sometimes we face jeering mobs. Sometimes we face dogs and the gushing waters from fire hoses. Sometimes in crowded jail cells we join hands to sing it. And sometimes in just open mass meetings. But we could sing it as a hymn of faith. We shall overcome, we shall overcome, deep in my heart I do believe we shall overcome.

=== Media ===
Illinois Wesleyan has its own radio station, WESN 88.1 FM. It plays a mix of indie, rock, classic, electronic, and folk music.

Wesleyan also has its own television station, Titan TV, broadcasting exclusively to IWU's residence halls. It broadcasts a collection of movies and campus announcements.

The campus newspaper is called The Argus, published continuously under student supervision since 1894. The publication features an array of articles, photographs, and cartoons by the students. The newspaper states that it "is an independent student newspaper," and that "The Argus serves the IWU community, but its content is not monitored, approved, or otherwise representative of IWU."

=== Transportation ===
Illinois Wesleyan University is served by Connect Transit. The Blue, Gold, and Green routes provide bus service between campus, downtown Bloomington, uptown Normal, and other destinations.

== Sustainability ==
IWU's Minor Myers Jr. Welcome Center, opened in 2008, and State Farm Hall, opened in 2013, include geothermal heating/cooling systems. The Welcome Center was awarded Silver Certification as a Leadership in Energy and Environmental Design (LEED) building.

The university's "Think Green" behavioral change campaign encourages community members to conserve resources.

== Notable alumni ==
- H. Clarence Baldridge, governor of Idaho
- Bill Brady, Illinois state senator, 2010 Republican candidate for governor of Illinois
- Charlene Carruthers, feminist activist, national director of Black Youth Project 100
- Alfred O. Coffin, first African American man to receive a PhD in Biology
- Bill Damaschke, head of Creative Production and Development, DreamWorks Animation
- Jeremy C. Daniel, federal judge for the United States District Court for the Northern District of Illinois, since 2023
- Kevin Dunn, actor, noted for his appearances in Transformers movie franchise and TV series Veep
- Frankie Faison, actor, noted for his appearance in all four Hannibal Lecter films
- George L. Fox, Chaplain's Medal for Heroism recipient and one of the famous Four Chaplains of World War II
- Richard Jenkins, Oscar-nominated actor, best known for his roles in The Visitor and Six Feet Under (2001–2005)
- Dave Kindred, columnist for Washington Post and Sporting News, elected to National Sportscasters and Sportswriters Hall of Fame
- Colleen Lawless, federal judge of the United States District Court for the Central District of Illinois since 2023
- Sigmund Livingston, founder of Anti-Defamation League
- Scott W. Lucas, senator of Illinois
- Denny Matthews, radio voice of Kansas City Royals since team's inception in 1969, Ford Frick Award recipient
- Bessie S. McColgin, Oklahoma legislator, first woman to serve in Oklahoma House of Representatives
- John F. Melby, United States diplomat to the Soviet Union during World War II and to China at the end of the Chinese Civil War
- Robert P. Regan, Illinois state representative and businessman
- Edward B. Rust Jr., CEO of State Farm
- Jack Sikma, seven-time NBA All-Star center and Hall of Fame inductee
- Ralph C. Smedley, founder of Toastmasters International
- Thomas Sterling, United States Congressional Senator
- Michael L. Tipsord, chairman and CEO of State Farm
- Robert C. Underwood (1915–1988), chief justice of the Illinois Supreme Court
- Dawn Upshaw, Grammy Award-winning soprano
- Phill Wilson, activist and founder of the Black AIDS Institute

== Notable faculty ==
- John Marshall Hamilton, politician
- Judy Jolley Mohraz, historian and 9th president of Goucher College
- John Wesley Powell, Civil War veteran, geographer, National Geographic Society co-founder
- Tari Renner, political science professor and politician
