= State Farm Holiday Classic =

The State Farm Holiday Classic, named after the title sponsor State Farm Insurance, is one of the largest co-ed, high school holiday basketball tournaments in the United States, with 64 teams (32 boys and 32 girls). Held annually for four days following Christmas and dubbed "The Best Basketball This Side of March", the Classic is held at numerous college and high-school venues throughout Bloomington-Normal, Illinois. In 2017 the tournament will be played December 27–30.

== History ==
For nearly four decades, the Holiday Classic has been a showcase of talent and basketball in Bloomington-Normal. The 2017 tournament will be the 39th anniversary for one of the nation's largest coed high school holiday basketball tournaments.

The Classic was originated in 1975 and was first called the Illinois State Classic. Normal Community High School was crowned the first boys champion by defeating Chicago Brother Rice, 60–51. Over the next 10 years (through 1985), Lincoln would play in the championship game four times (winning twice) and Galesburg would win four championships, including three straight titles from 1981 to 1983. In the beginning, the Classic field consisted of a combination of 16 Class A (small school) and Class AA (large school) teams, from all over the state including all four intercity schools. The Classic took a break from 1986 through 1989, but came back in 1990 and was known as the University High Classic. Sherrard was crowned the champ in 1990, and two years later Gridley became the first Class A school to slay the giants and walk away as champion of the Holiday Classic.

In 1995, the Classic turned down the road that would eventually lead it to the event as it is known today. A community volunteer group, spearheaded by current tournament president Dan Highland, took over all duties and responsibilities for the tournament. This group, then known as the Classic Organizing Group, Inc. (COG), consisted of leaders from all aspects of the Bloomington-Normal community. The tournament was then called the Bloomington-Normal Holiday Classic, and later took on Converse as its title sponsor in 1996 and 1997. Major changes implemented at the time included having 32 participating boys' teams, and breaking the field into two 16-team sections (Class A and Class AA to mirror the IHSA state tournament). All teams would be guaranteed three games, and those teams which won all three games would come back on the fourth and final day to determine a champion in each class in the morning. The night session would consist of the two losing teams playing against each other for third place, while the two champs went head to head for the title of Grand Champion. Rockford Boylan won the first Grand Championship game in 1995, defeating Bloomington Central Catholic 74–63. The next year saw Manito Midwest Central, led by Ryan Knuppel, become the second Class A team to win the Classic by defeating Boylan, 64–58, in one of the most exciting games in tournament history.

The Classic also took on a different twist in 1995 by hosting an 8-team girls' shootout. This shootout evolved into a 14-team tournament in 1997, and is now a full-fledged 32-team tournament, mirroring the boys tournament format. Galesburg was the first girls Grand Champion in 1997, by overcoming a 17-point deficit and winning a 77-74 thriller over Class A Mendota on a last-second three-pointer by Jaque Howard. Galesburg won the first three Grand Championships (1997, 98 & 99) and had a winning streak of 16 games, before being defeated by Urbana in 2000. That same year, Rock Island Alleman became the only Class A team, and the only team other than Galesburg, to win the girls Grand Championship.

In 1999, the Classic got a big shot in the arm with the announcement of State Farm Insurance as its title sponsor. The State Farm Holiday Classic, as it is known today, was able to implement a variety of enhancements thanks to this support, and still continues to find new ways to be the best tournament in the nation. By now the event was starting to gain national recognition, and that included adding teams from across the country to its tournament field. After testing the waters with a team from Milwaukee, Wisconsin in 1996, the Classic has seen teams participate from Washington, D.C., Kentucky, Tennessee, Ohio, Indiana, Florida, Arizona, Missouri, Pennsylvania and Louisiana.

In 2001, the COG, now known as the Classic Tournament, Inc., experimented with eliminating the cross-over Grand Championship game and crowning two girls' champions, one in each class. The experiment worked so well that the same idea was implemented into the boys' tournament in 2002. By this time, the Grand Championship game had become somewhat anticlimactic for the fans and teams alike, as many times the Class AA teams were too overpowering for the smaller schools. With the new system in place, all teams are now guaranteed four games and championship night has been revived to the point where near capacity Shirk Center crowds are able to witness four consecutive championship games.

Over the years the Classic has seen its share of great individual performances. In 1985, Rockton Hononegah's Jim Shikenjanski averaged nearly 33 points a game, and pulled down 66 rebounds over the course of the tournament. Eight years later in 1993, Mike Robinson of Peoria Richwoods knocked down 18 field goals in one game, while in 1999 Rock Island Alleman's Tyler Ryan killed 9 three-pointers for a tournament record. In 1996, Joey Range from Galesburg wowed the crowd with a tournament record 55 points in one game, while Normal U-High's Jeremy Stanton delivered an unselfish 18 assists in one game. And of course who could forget watching the man-child, Eddy Curry, go from signing autographs in the Shirk Center bleachers to a first round draft pick of the Chicago Bulls right out of South Holland Thornwood. Yet maybe the crowning individual achievement was when Olney East Richland's Brittany Johnson became Illinois' all-time career (girls or boys) prep hoops scoring leader in the second round of the 2006 tournament, breaking the record on a three-point play in the third quarter.

With the Classic becoming more successful, it looked for ways to give back the community and increase its philanthropic efforts. In 2002, local Special Olympics Illinois basketball teams were given the chance to participate in a one-day shootout at the Shirk Center on Championship Day of the tournament. These teams then had the chance to participate in an 8-minute exhibition during halftime of the championship games that night on the Shirk Center floor. This effort proved to be very popular among the full-house crowd in attendance, as well as the players who experienced this once-in-a-lifetime opportunity. The shootout has continued each year, and in 2005 it was renamed the Ron Knisley Memorial Special Olympics shootout after the long-time committee member and huge Classic supporter, who was also Director of Sports and Competition for Special Olympics Illinois.

In 2006, the first recipients of the Holiday Classic Foundation Scholarships were awarded in an effort to give back to graduating seniors who participated in the Holiday Classic and were extending their educational careers at four-year universities or colleges. To date, the Classic Foundation has awarded $44,000.00 in scholarships to deserving student-athletes.

All of these changes and enhancements over the years have led thousands of fans to discover what we know today as "The Best Basketball This Side Of March!"

== The Best of the Best ==
Over the years the Holiday Classic has seen its share of great teams and players. Here is just a sample of those players:

NBA players:

- Kevin Duckworth of the Los Angeles Clippers/Milwaukee Bucks/Washington Bullets/Portland Trail Blazers/San Antonio Spurs (Dolton Thornridge)
- Melvin McCants of the Los Angeles Lakers (Chicago Mt. Carmel High School)
- Eddy Curry of the Dallas Mavericks/Miami Heat/New York Knicks/Chicago Bulls (South Holland Thornwood High School)
- Brian Cook of the Washington Wizards/Los Angeles Clippers/Houston Rockets/Orlando Magic/Los Angeles Lakers (Lincoln High School)

WNBA players:

- LaToya Bond of the Indiana Fever/Sacramento Monarchs/Charlotte Sting (Urbana High School)
- Angelina Williams of the Detroit Shock/Phoenix Mercury (Chicago Washington High School)
- Kayla Pedersen of the Tulsa Shock and Connecticut Sun (Mesa Red Mountain High School, AZ)

European professional leagues players:

- Brian Cook (Lincoln) of the Chiba Jets in Japan
- Eddy Curry (South Holland Thornwood) played with the Chinese League's Zhejiang Golden Bulls team
- Rachel Galligan (Blm. Central Catholic) played with Club Baloncesto Conquero in Spain
- Carl Golston (Chicago Phillips) played in New Zealand, Italy and Spain
- Damir Krupalija (Rockford Boylan) of the 2002-03 Polish National Champions Anwil Wloclawek, and 2003-04 Belgian National Champions Spirou Charleroi
- Brittany Johnson (East Richland) of the 2013 Israel Elitzer Ramla
- Olivia Lett (Pana) of the Spain League's Universitario de Ferrol team
- Kayla Pederesen (Mesa Red Mountain, AZ) of the Australian Women's National Basketball League Dandenong Rangers
- Chasson Randle (Rock Island) of the Czech Republic-based CEZ Nymburk
- Blake Schilb (Rantoul) of the French League's Elan Chalon team

Harlem Globetrotter:

- Curley "Boo" Johnson (Peoria Central)

Illinois Mr. Basketball award winners:

- Brian Cook (Lincoln) – 1999
- Eddy Curry (Thornwood) – 2001
- Chasson Randle (Rock Island) – 2011

Illinois Ms. Basketball award winners:

- Brittany Johnson (Olney East Richland) – 2007

McDonald's High School All-Americans:

- Brian Cook (Lincoln) – 1999
- Eddy Curry (Thornwood) – 2001
- Tori McCoy (Champaign St. Thomas More) – 2016
- Kayla Pedersen (Mesa Red Mountain, AZ) – 2007
- Mike Robinson (Peoria Richwoods) – 1996
- Chuck Verderber (Lincoln)- 1978

Naismith National Player of the Year award finalist:

- Tori McCoy (Champaign St. Thomas More) – 2016

Wendy's High School Heisman Trophy finalists:

- Kelly Curran (Blm Central Catholic) – 2009
- Rebekah Ehresman (El Paso-Gridley) – 2013

NCAA Final Four participants:

- 1997 – John Baines (Normal U-High), Korey Coon (East Peoria) and Nathan Hubbard (Normal U-High) lead Illinois Wesleyan University to the D-III Men's National Championship title
- 2000 – Mark Vershaw (East Peoria) lead University of Wisconsin to the Final Four
- 2005 – Brian Randle (Peoria Notre Dame) was a redshirt freshman on the University of Illinois team that reached the D-I championship game
- 2008-12 – Kayla Pedersen (Mesa Red Mountain, AZ) lead Stanford University to four consecutive Final Four appearances
- 2009-11 – Emily Hanley (Normal Community) and Amanda Clifton (Rock Island Alleman) helped lead Illinois State University to three straight WNIT Final Four appearances from 2009 to 2011
- 2011 & 2012 – Brittany Hasselbring (Kankakee Bishop Mac), Olivia Lett (Pana), Karen Solari (Park Ridge Maine South), Annie Brown (Normal West), Katy Seibring (Normal Community), Haley Kitchell (Taylor Ridge Rockridge) and Jordan Steinbrueck (Normal U-High) lead Illinois Wesleyan University to the 2012 D-III Women's National Championship after taking them to the 2011 D-III Women's Final Four (fourth place)
- 2012 & 2015 – Chasson Randle (Rock Island) lead the Stanford Cardinal to the NIT Tournament Championship
- 2013 – Matt Vogrich (Lake Forest) and Max Bielfeldt (Peoria Notre Dame) helped lead the Michigan Wolverines to the D-I Championship Game and Final Four in Atlanta

Illinois' all-time prep career scorer:

- Brittany Johnson (Olney East Richland) became Illinois' all-time prep career scorer (male or female) on Dec. 28, 2006 during the second round of the State Farm Holiday Classic. She played four seasons for The Ohio State University women's basketball team.

Illinois' all-time prep career rusher (football):

- James Robinson (Rockford Lutheran) became the IHSA's career rushing leader on Oct. 9, 2015 in a game vs. Byron.

NFL Super Bowl Champion:

- Michael Hoomanawanui (Bloomington Central Catholic) of the 2015 New England Patriots (originally a 5th round draft pick of the St. Louis Rams in 2010)

BSC National Championship football game participant:

- Tommy Rees (Lake Forest) helped lead the Notre Dame Fighting Irish to the 2013 national championship college football game vs. Alabama.

European Professional Football players:

- Chris Markey (New Orleans Jesuit) played for the Zurich Renegades and was named the Swiss League Offensive MVP.

Major League Baseball/minor league players:

- Kevin Seitzer (Lincoln) played in MLB from 1986 to 1997 with the Kansas City Royals, Milwaukee Brewers, Oakland A's and Cleveland Indians, making the 1987 All-Star team and finishing as runner-up for the American League Rookie of the Year award. Kevin is currently the hitting coach for the Atlanta Braves.
- Kevin Roberson (Decatur Eisenhower) played in MLB from 1993 to 1996 with the Chicago Cubs and New York Mets
- Tyson Blaser (Taylor Ridge Rockridge) signed a minor league deal with the New York Yankees in 2011 and started the 2013 season with their Class AA affiliate Trenton Thunder.
- Robbie Minor (Rock Falls) played one season (2007) in the New York Yankees minor league system, and the 2008 season for the Gateway Grizzlies in the Frontier League
- Josh Parr (Chillicothe IVC) signed a minor league deal with the Arizona Diamondbacks in 2011 after playing at the University of Illinois. Parr finished his career with the South Bend Silver Hawks in 2014.
- Zach McAllister (Chillicothe IVC) was drafted by the New York Yankees in 2006 and traded to the Cleveland Indians in 2010 where he made his major league debut on July 7, 2011, vs. the Toronto Blue Jays. Zach finished up his fifth season with the Indians in 2015.
- Jakob Junis (Rock Falls) was drafted by the Kansas City Royals in 2011 and finished the 2015 season with the Class A Advanced Wilmington Blue Rocks.

U.S. Olympian:

- Ogonna Nnamani member of the 2004 and 2008 United States Olympic women's volleyball team (Normal U-High)

Professional soccer player:

- Ashlee Pistorius won the Honda Sports Award in 2008 as the nation's top collegiate soccer player at Texas A&M, and played for the Boston Renegades of the USL W-League (Normal U-High)

== All-Quarter-century team ==
In 2003, fans had a chance to vote on the most outstanding performers in the 25-year history of the tournament. The following team was chosen:

- Brian Cook, Lincoln | 315 votes
- Eddy Curry, Thornwood | 271 votes
- Joey Range, Galesburg | 216 votes
- Gregg Alexander, Lincoln | 143 votes
- Robbie Minor, Rock Falls | 126 votes
- Damir Krupaliga, Rockford Boylan | 121 votes

== Past boys' champions ==
Note: Starting in 2002, the Grand Championship game was eliminated and two champions, one in each class, were crowned.

=== Past Grand Champions ===
- 1975 Normal Community
- 1976 LaSalle-Peru
- 1977 Lincoln
- 1978 East Moline
- 1979 Galesburg
- 1980 Lincoln
- 1981 Galesburg
- 1982 Galesburg
- 1983 Galesburg
- 1984 Decatur Eisenhower
- 1985 Normal Community
- 1986 (No tournament held)
- 1987 (No tournament held)
- 1988 (No tournament held)
- 1989 (No tournament held)
- 1990 Sherrard
- 1991 Normal UHigh
- 1992 Gridley
- 1993 Peoria Richwoods
- 1994 East Peoria
- 1995 Rockford Boylan
- 1996 Manito Midwest Central
- 1997 Galesburg
- 1998 Rockford Boylan
- 1999 South Holland Thornwood
- 2000 South Holland Thornwood
- 2001 South Holland Thornwood

=== Past Small School Boys Champions ===
- 2002 Quincy Notre Dame
- 2003 Lagrange Keystone, Ohio
- 2004 Quincy Notre Dame
- 2005 Hartsburg-Emden
- 2006 Bloomington Central Catholic
- 2007 Bloomington Central Catholic
- 2008 Peoria Christian
- 2009 Minonk Fieldcrest
- 2010 Rock Falls
- 2011 Quincy Notre Dame
- 2012 Rockford Lutheran
- 2013 Rockford Lutheran
- 2014 Rockford Lutheran
- 2015 Quincy Notre Dame
- 2016 Quincy Notre Dame
- 2017 Aurora Christian

=== Past Large School Boys Champions ===
- 2002 South Holland Thornwood
- 2003 Chicago Prosser
- 2004 Mt. Zion
- 2005 South Holland Thornwood
- 2006 South Holland Thornwood
- 2007 Rockton-Hononegah
- 2008 Normal Community
- 2009 Champaign Centennial
- 2010 Peoria Notre Dame
- 2011 Normal Community
- 2012 North Chicago
- 2013 North Chicago
- 2014 Normal Community
- 2015 Rock Island
- 2016 Joliet Central
- 2017 Normal Community

== Past Girls Champions ==
Note: Starting in 2001, the Grand Championship game was eliminated and two champions, one in each class, were crowned.

=== Past Grand Champions ===
- 1997 Galesburg
- 1998 Galesburg
- 1999 Galesburg
- 2000 Rock Island Alleman

=== Past Small School Girls Champions ===
- 2001 Seneca
- 2002 Normal UHigh
- 2003 Bloomington Central Catholic
- 2004 Rock Island Alleman
- 2005 Chicago John Hope
- 2006 Olney East Richland
- 2007 Rochester
- 2008 Bloomington Central Catholic
- 2009 Bloomington Central Catholic
- 2010 Bloomington Central Catholic
- 2011 El Paso-Gridley
- 2012 Champaign St. Thomas More
- 2013 Champaign St. Thomas More
- 2014 Rochester
- 2015 Rockford Lutheran
- 2016 Camp Point Central / Augusta Southeastern
- 2017 Annawan

=== Past Large School Girls Champions ===
- 2001 Geneseo
- 2002 Peoria Richwoods
- 2003 Normal Community
- 2004 Peoria Richwoods
- 2005 Peoria Richwoods
- 2006 Bolingbrook
- 2007 Chicago John Hope
- 2008 Peoria Richwoods
- 2009 Springfield
- 2010 Springfield
- 2011 Park Ridge Maine South
- 2012 Champaign Centennial
- 2013 Springfield
- 2014 Normal University
- 2015 Chicago North Lawndale
- 2016 Rock Island
- 2017 Morton

== State Farm Holiday Classic Scholarship Award ==
In 2006 the Classic Tournament, Inc., the nonprofit corporation which runs the largest co-ed high school holiday basketball tournament in the nation, selected four winners to be the first-ever recipients of the Holiday Classic Scholarship Award. Each winner received a $1,000 scholarship to go directly to their college of choice to help pay for tuition costs.

Established to recognize and award scholarships to eligible high school seniors who participated in the event, a selection committee chooses a male and female winner from each of the Small School and Large School brackets.

Holiday Classic Scholarship recipients:

- Nick Patkunas, Normal U-High (2015)
- Carolyn Peters, Normal West (2015)
- Karalee White, Leroy (2015)
- Nathaniel Wieting, Rockford Lutheran (2015)
- Alexa Adams - Belvidere North (2014)
- Rebekah Ehresman - El Paso-Gridley (2014)
- Michael Plecki - Champaign St. Thomas-More (2014)
- Trey Sigel - Rock Island (2014)
- Bradley Dulee, Normal U-High (2013)
- Lauren Frank, Springfield Sacred Heart-Griffin (2013)
- Cole Hasselbring, Cissna Park (2013)
- Megan O'Donnell, Bloomington Central Catholic (2013)
- Brian Ehresman - El Paso-Gridley (2012)
- Paige Lobdell - Sterling (2012)
- Annie O'Malley - Bloomington Central Catholic (2012)
- Patrick Walsh - Lombard Glenbard East (2012)
- Nickolena Coop - Downs Tri-Valley (2011)
- Blake Doane - Quincy Notre Dame (2011)
- Kayla Moore - Sterling Newman (2011)
- Ryan Schmidt - Bloomington Central Catholic (2011)
- Kevin Bischoff – Normal Community (2010)
- Rachael Graham – St. Joseph-Ogden (2010)
- Erin McGinnis – Normal West (2010)
- Andrew Sipes – Grayslake Central (2010)
- Kristen Baldwin, Normal Community (2009)
- Luke Harbers, Normal University (2009)
- Cora Jeffers, Williamsville (2009)
- Ross Munsterman, Crescent-Iroquois (2009)
- Brandi Branka, Kankakee Bishop Mac (2008)
- Andrew Etheridge, Normal Community (2008)
- Kati Hinshaw, Normal West (2008)
- Randall Koehler, Roanoke-Benson (2008)
- Samantha Reich, Park Ridge Maine South (2008)
- Jack Hainline, Stanford Olympia (2007)
- Patrick Doggett, Crescent Iroquois (2007)
- Kimberly White, Olney East Richland (2007)
- Matt Pelton, Bloomington Central Catholic (2006)
- Cherelle Gay, Bloomington (2006)
- Jordan Christensen, Sherrard (2006)
- Taylor Baucom, Camp Point Central (2006)

== Ron Knisley Memorial Special Olympics Shootout ==
On October 13, 2005, the Classic Tournament Inc. lost a very special and vital part of this event when Ron Knisley, Director of Sports and Competition for Special Olympics Illinois lost his battle to cancer. That year, the tournament decided to name the Special Olympics portion of the State Farm Holiday Classic after the man who was responsible for bringing the two groups together.

The shootout, which brings in area Special Olympics Illinois (SOI) basketball teams as part of championship day at the annual State Farm Holiday Classic basketball tournament, is now known as the Ron Knisley Memorial Special Olympics Shootout. The Shootout traditionally invites six teams who play games on the final day of the tournament on practice courts at the Shirk Center. Then, each of the teams is featured during half-time of the championship games on the final night of the tournament in an 8-minute, running clock exhibition on the main floor.

Past participants in the Shootout include teams from the following programs:

- Beardstown
- Bloomington SOAR
- Bradley-Bourbonnais High School
- Champaign-Urbana Special Recreation
- Decatur Park District
- Eastern Illinois Special Olympics
- Jacksonville Pathway
- Lincoln Park District
- Lincolnway
- Neuwohner (MO)
- Pekin IRVSRA
- Peoria Heart of Illinois
- Pontiac Futures
- Porter County, Indiana
- Princeton Gateway Services
- Rushville
- Southern Illinois
- Springfield
- Thornwood
