= Kevin Miles (American actor) =

American actor (born 1990)

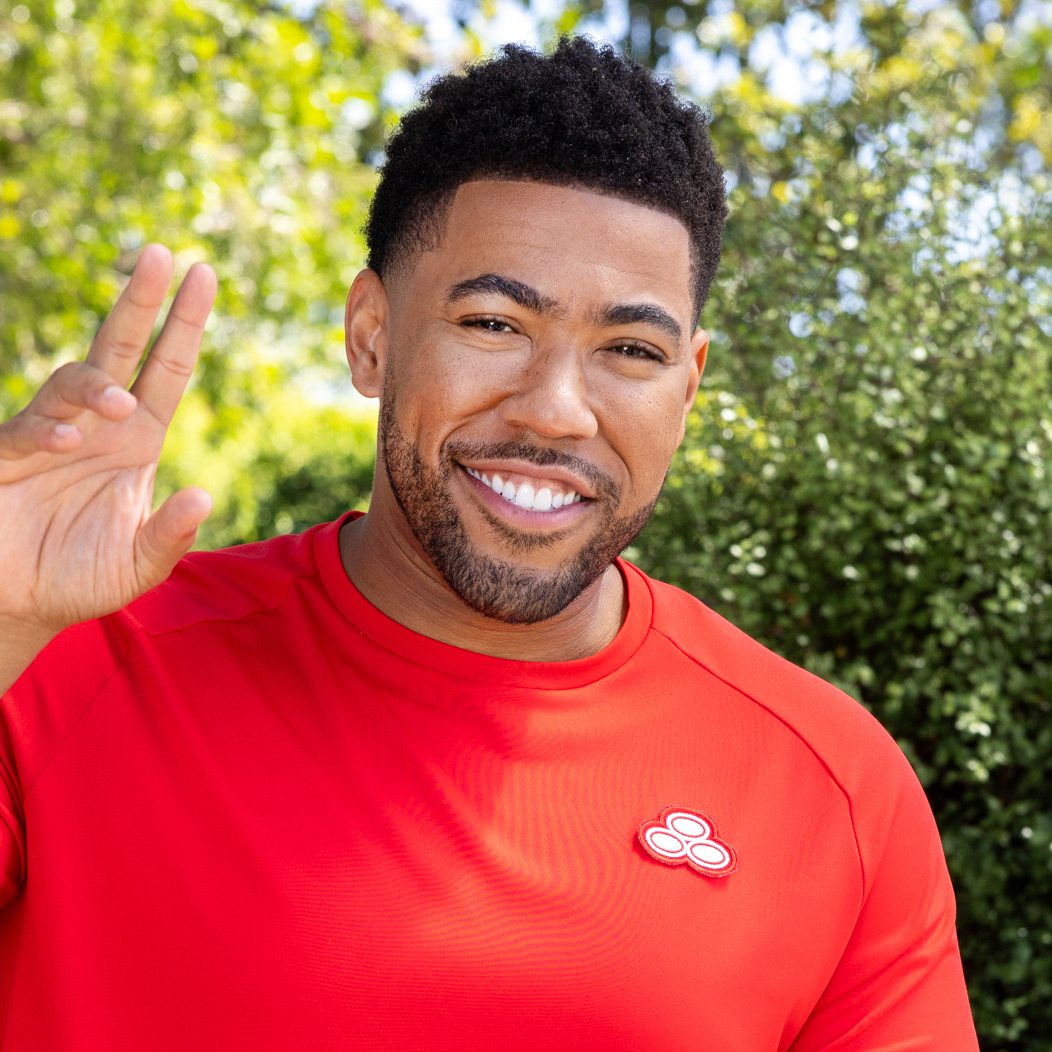
- Miles in 2023
- Born: Kevin Miles Julian Mimms; July 5, 1990 (age 36)
- Education: Webster University (BFA)
- Occupation: Actor
- Known for: State Farm commercials

Kevin Miles Julian Mimms (July 5, 1990) is an American actor best known for his role as Jake, the spokesman for State Farm insurance company.

== Early life and education ==
Miles grew up on the South Side of Chicago, and he began acting in elementary school. His first acting role was as Lord Capulet in a school theater production of Romeo and Juliet. He graduated from the Chicago Academy for the Arts in 2008 before going on to study at Conservatory of Theater Arts at Webster University. He graduated with a Bachelor of Fine Arts.

== Career ==
After graduating from university, Miles moved to Los Angeles to pursue a career in acting. For the first few months he lived there, he slept in his car because he could not afford an apartment. For his first two years in Los Angeles, he had no agent. He appeared in commercials for various companies before appearing on television shows such as Criminal Minds, S.W.A.T, and iCarly. In 2020, he went on to apply for the role of Jake in a State Farm advertisement but forgot to wear the red shirt and khaki pants required in the wardrobe briefing. Despite this, his audition tested well, and he was chosen for the role.

In July 2020, Miles traveled to Austin, Texas to film State Farm advertisements for several months, and soon thereafter he grew in popularity. He made his first appearance in a Super Bowl commercial in 2021, starring alongside Drake and Patrick Mahomes. His popularity led him to collaborate with several other celebrities including Ludacris, Jimmy Fallon, Chris Paul, Cooper Flagg, and Jimmy Butler. In October 2023, Maximum Effort arranged for him to appear alongside Donna Kelce at a football game. He co-starred with Arnold Schwarzenegger in a 2024 Super Bowl commercial, and Schwarzenegger physically trained Miles for the role. According to Schwarzenegger, Miles lost 2% of his body fat as a result of the training. He also appeared at the 2024 WNBA draft to congratulate basketball player Caitlin Clark, who is also a spokesperson for State Farm.

Miles stated that he hopes his role as Jake will allow him to further his career in the film industry, and that he seeks to follow the examples of actors such as Sidney Poitier and Denzel Washington.
