= George J. Mecherle =

American businessman

- Born: June 7, 1877; Merna, Illinois, US
- Died: March 10, 1951 (aged 73); Bloomington, Illinois, US
- Occupation(s): farmer, insurance agent
- Known for: founder of State Farm Insurance
- Spouses: May Edith Perry Mecherle (m. 1900–1942) (her death) Sylvia Mae Harbaugh Mecherle (m. 1944–1951) (his death)

George Jacob "G.J." Mecherle (pronounced "Ma-herl") (June 7, 1877–March 10, 1951) was the founder of State Farm, headquartered in Bloomington, Illinois. Mecherle, a farmer who later became an insurance agent, founded State Farm after becoming dissatisfied with the insurance rates charged to farmers, as those rates included the risks of city drivers as well.

== Early career ==
Mecherle was known as a very progressive and scientific farmer. However, in 1919 he quit farming and moved to Florida to improve his wife's health — she had rheumatoid arthritis. The warm climate did not improve her health so they moved back to Central Illinois in 1921.

After returning to Illinois, he sold tractors and discovered that he had a skill for selling to farmers. Believing that city insurance companies were "rooking" farmers with high premiums based upon city driving accident rates, he became obsessed with the idea of starting his own insurance company — "an honest insurance company" was the phrase Mecherle used.

== State Farm ==
In the spring of 1921, Tazewell County Farm Bureau organized a township mutual insurance company — which was the idea Mecherle had been considering — a mutual insurance company which is owned by those who are insured through a membership. The Tazewell company was set up to insure property, including automobiles.

Mecherle then attended a meeting of the Federation of Mutual Fire Insurance Companies in the summer of 1921 in St. Louis. He spoke with the Tazewell County Farm Bureau president, and those discussions helped to crystallize Mecherle's idea of starting "an honest insurance company."

Eventually, Mecherle's idea began taking shape and he opened his first office late in 1921 in the Illinois House in downtown Bloomington.

In January 1922, he developed a prospectus and presented it to the Illinois State Association of Mutual Insurance Companies meeting in Streator. The plan called for his company to sell automobile insurance to:

members of Farm Bureau, members of farm mutuals, their immediate families, or those eligible for membership in such organizations.

The association enthusiastically endorsed the plan, and Mecherle proceeded to get the state license he needed to operate. On June 8, 1922, — the day after George Mecherle's 45th birthday — State Farm Mutual Automobile Insurance Company was in business.

Mecherle attempted to adopt programs that gave financial strength to his growing company while providing unique benefits to policyholders beyond what was offered at the time.

For example, he adopted a strict no-drinking and driving provision to reduce accidents, and he also instituted the first installment payment program for premiums. This was to allow farmers premiums to become due when they expected to receive their crop payments.

Eventually, his company became the largest property and casualty insurer in the United States and one of the 20 largest corporations on the Fortune 500.
