= Edward B. Rust Jr. =

American businessperson (born 1950)

Edward Barry Rust Jr. (born August 3, 1950) is an American businessman who was chairman of the board of State Farm Mutual Automobile Insurance Company. He is a former president and chief executive officer of State Farm Mutual Automobile Insurance Company and State Farm Fire and Casualty Company, State Farm Life Insurance Company, and other principal State Farm affiliates. Rust stepped down on September 1, 2015; when Michael Tipsord was named the new president and CEO of State Farm Insurance. Rust's father, Edward Sr., and his grandfather, Adlai Rust, also led State Farm.

A native of Illinois, Rust joined State Farm in 1975. He is the son of Edward Barry Rust Sr., who was the former chief executive officer and chairman of State Farm Insurance Companies. He became president and chief executive officer in 1985 and was elected to the additional post of chairman of the board in 1987.

A graduate of Bloomington High School in 1968 and then a graduate of Illinois Wesleyan University in Bloomington, Rust holds both juris doctor and master of business degrees from Southern Methodist University. He serves on the boards of directors of Caterpillar Inc. and Helmerich & Payne

He is also on the board of McGraw-Hill, is one of two co-chairs of the Business Roundtable, and is on the board of directors for the United States Chamber of Commerce.

In June 2015, Rust announced he would step down as CEO of State Farm in September 2015.

== Awards ==
In 2013, AdvisoryCloud ranked Rust as the #6 CEO on their Top Chief Executive List.

Rust was inducted as a Laureate of The Lincoln Academy of Illinois and awarded the Order of Lincoln (the state's highest honor) by the Governor of Illinois in 2003 in the area of business.
