= State Farm =

American insurance company

State Farm Mutual Automobile Insurance Company
- Logo used since January 1, 2012
- Type: Private (mutual)
- Industry: Insurance
- Founded: June 7, 1922; 104 years ago
- Founder: George J. Mecherle
- Successor: Desjardins Insurance (Canada)
- Headquarters: Bloomington, Illinois, U.S.
- Number of locations: 19,000 agents 343 claim offices 30 operations centers
- Area served: United States
- Key people: Michael L. Tipsord (Chairman); Jon Farney (President & CEO)
- Services: Banking; Insurance; Investing
- Revenue: ▲US$104.2 billion (2023)
- Net income: ▼US$-6.3 billion (2023)
- Total assets: ▲US$220.788 billion (2023)
- Total equity: ▲US$134.8 billion (2023)
- Number of employees: 65,000 (2023)
- Subsidiaries: See Subsidiaries below.
- Website: www.statefarm.com

State Farm Insurance is a group of mutual insurance companies throughout the United States with corporate headquarters in Bloomington, Illinois. Founded in 1922, it is the largest property, casualty and auto insurance provider in the United States.

== Overview ==
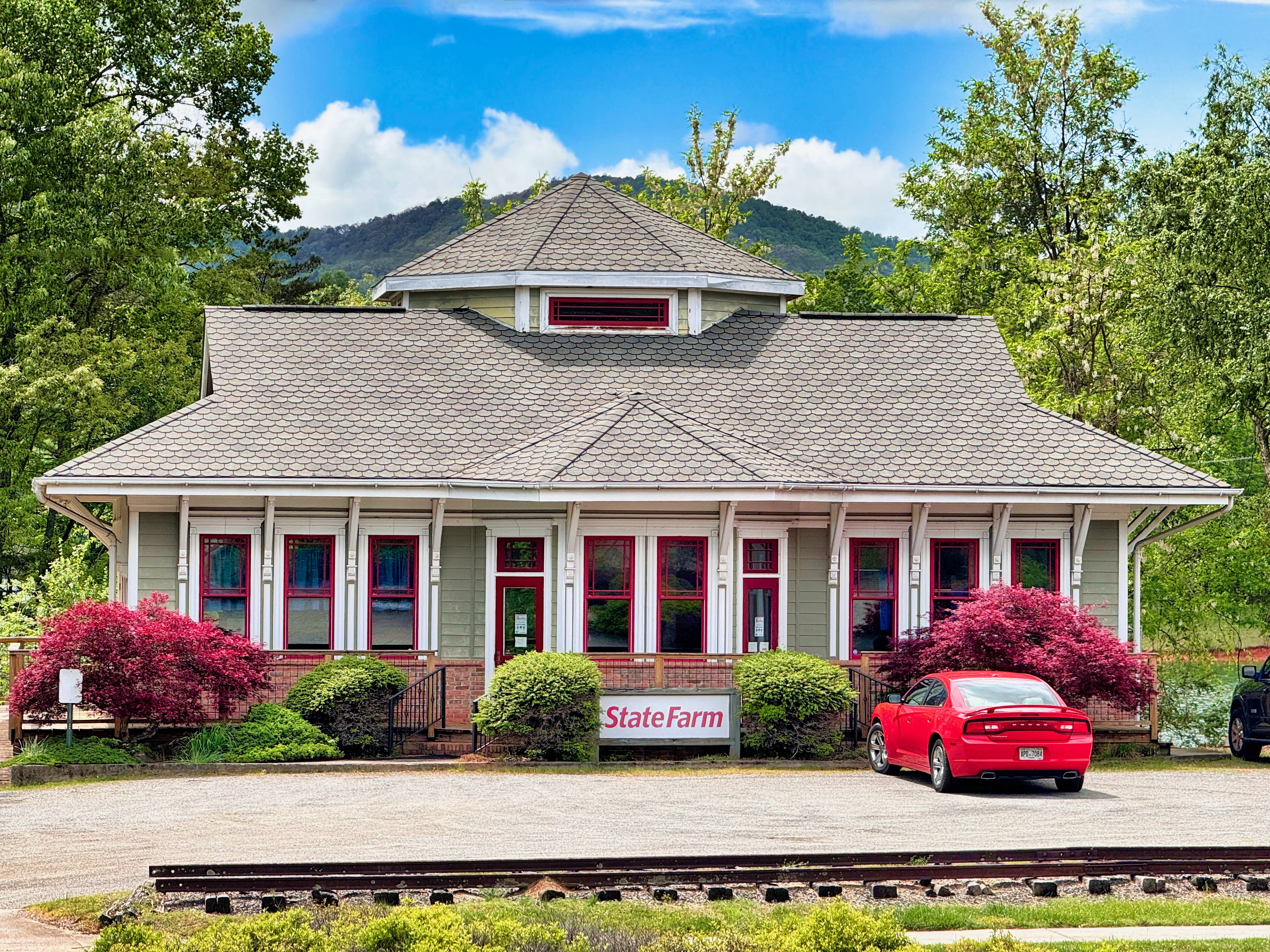
A State Farm Insurance office occupies a classic railroad depot in Hiawassee, Georgia

State Farm is the largest property and casualty insurance provider, and the largest auto insurance provider, in the United States. State Farm is ranked 39th in the 2024 Fortune 500, which lists American companies by revenue.

State Farm relies on exclusive agents (also known as captive agents) to sell insurance. Only State Farm agents can sell State Farm insurance, and their agents can sell only State Farm products.

=== Financial services ===
In 1999, State Farm had expanded into the financial services arena. The bank opened in May 1999 and was operated by State Farm Financial Services, FSB, a subsidiary of State Farm Mutual Automobile Insurance Co. These were separate from its insurance products. State Farm Bank did not have branch offices. Its regular banking services, which include checking and savings accounts, certificates of deposit, and money market accounts, were available to consumers countrywide via the Internet or, over the phone, and through agents. Home mortgages were available countrywide over the phone or through agents.

== History ==
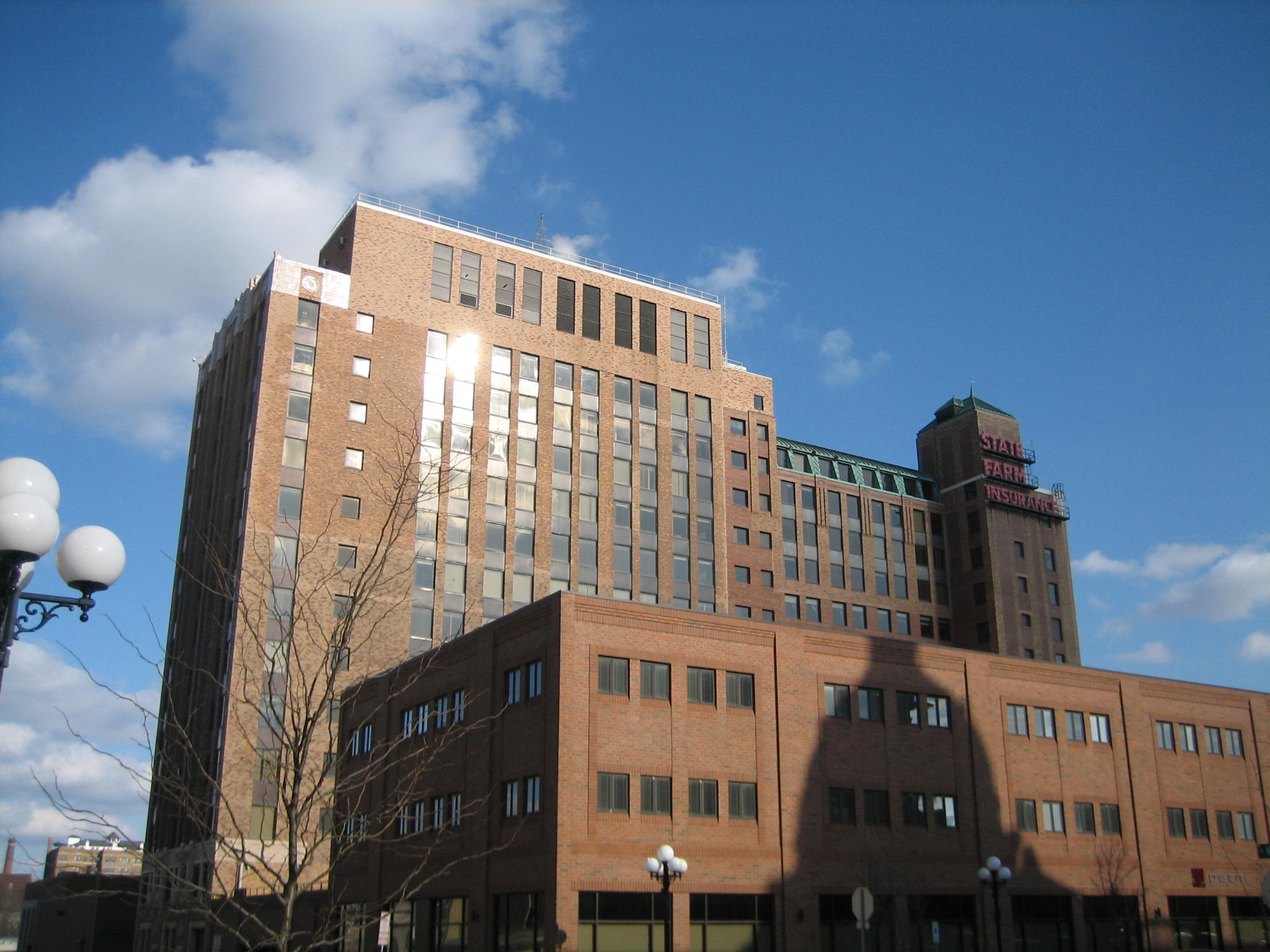
State Farm Insurance "Fire Building" in downtown Bloomington, Illinois

State Farm was founded in June 1922 by retired farmer George J. Mecherle as a mutual automobile insurance company owned by its policyholders. The firm specialized in auto insurance for farmers and offered better rates than rival companies, which also covered expensive premiums of the urban motorists.

As of December 2, 2017, State Farm had 70,000 employees and 19,000 agents.

Michael L. Tipsord is chairman and CEO of State Farm Mutual Automobile Insurance Company. The company announced on December 28, 2023, that Tipsord will be retiring in 2024 and will be succeeded by Jon Farney, currently the company's chief financial officer. Jon Farney is the current president and chief executive officer of State Farm Mutual Automobile Insurance Company.

By 2017, State Farms announced its plan to exit 11 facilities in the United States to streamline and improve processes. In 2014, it sold its operations in Canada to Desjardins Group, which continued to use the State Farm name. Canadian policies were transferred to be underwritten by Desjardins Group on January 1, 2015. The State Farm brand continued to be used for agents and marketing until 2018. In 2018, State Farm Canada was officially rebranded to Desjardins Insurance through Desjardins Insurance Agents. The whole transition was completed in 2019.

On May 28, 2023, the company announced it would stop issuing new home insurance policies in California due to wildfire risks and surging construction costs.

In February 2025, State Farm, the largest home insurer in California, requested state regulators to approve an emergency rate increase due to the financial strain caused by payouts related to the January 2025 Southern California wildfires. The company is seeking an average rate hike of 22%, effective May 1, 2025. Specifically, the proposed increases include a 15% rise for renters and condominium owners and a 38% increase for insurance on rental dwellings. This follows previous rate adjustments, with a 6.9% increase granted in 2023 and a 20% increase the year before. Additionally, there is a pending request for a 30% hike, though it is unclear if this is still being pursued alongside the 22% increase.

=== Logo ===
State Farm used the tri-oval logo from 1953 until December 31, 2011

On December 15, 2011, State Farm transformed its interlocked tri-oval logo into a contemporary one to showcase the company's core service offerings of auto, fire, and life insurance. The new logo was introduced on January 1, 2012, in celebration of the company's 90th anniversary. It consists of a simple three-oval design with no wording in the ovals adjacent to the State Farm wordmark. According to Pam El, marketing vice president at State Farm, a change in image was needed to employ a bolder presence that could compete in today's digital world.

=== CEOs ===
| CEO | Years served |
|---|---|
| George J. Mecherle | 1922–1937 (14) |
| Raymond Mecherle | 1937–1954 (16) |
| Adlai Rust | 1954–1970 (15) |
| Edward B. Rust Sr. | 1970–1985 (14) |
| Edward B. Rust Jr. | 1985–2015 (29) |
| Michael L. Tipsord | 2015–2024 |
| Jon Farney | 2024–present |

== Subsidiaries ==
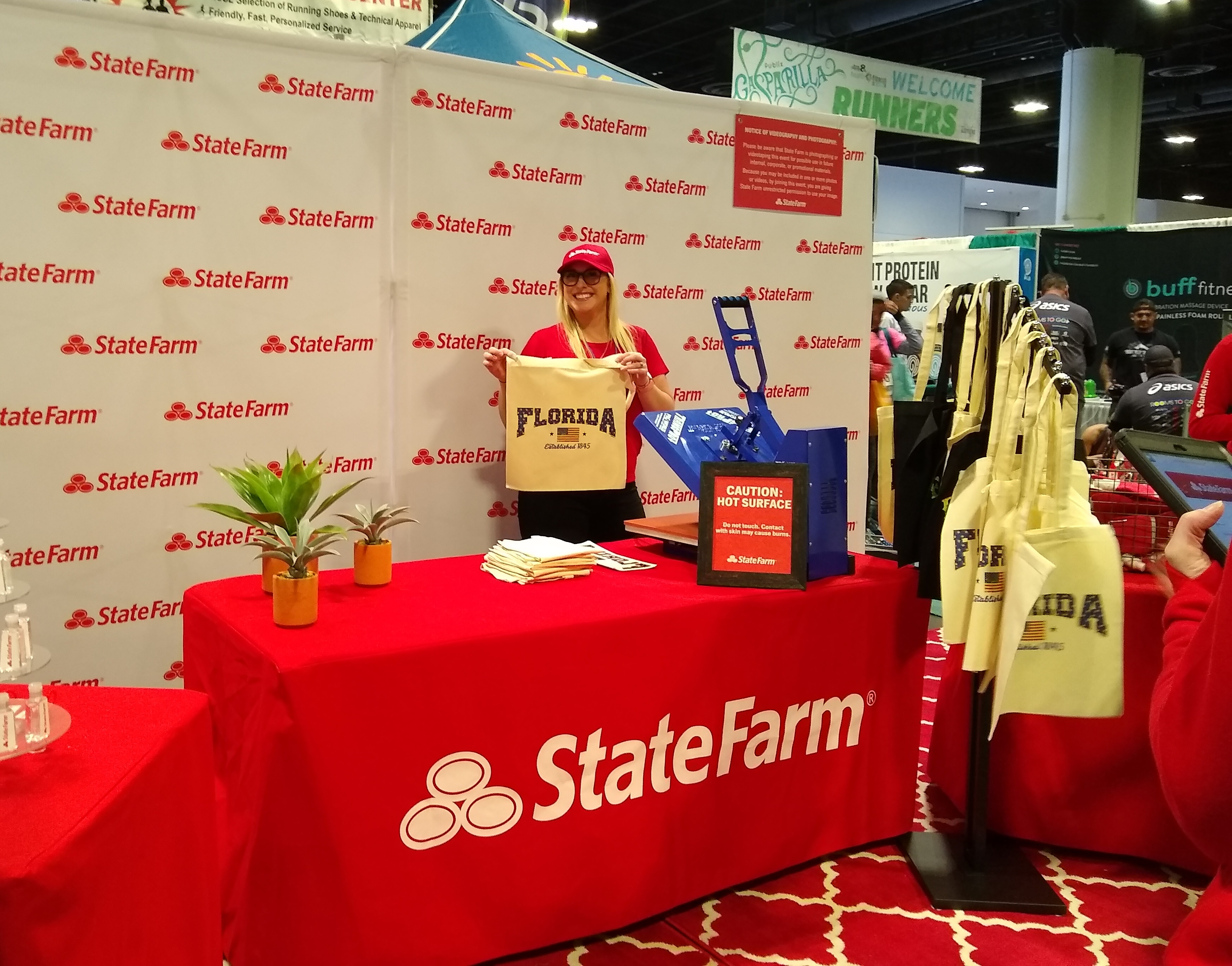
The State Farm booth at the Gasparilla Distance Classic Expo in 2020

State Farm Mutual Automobile Insurance Company is the parent company of several wholly owned State Farm subsidiaries:

- State Farm Fire and Casualty Company
- State Farm Life Insurance Company
- State Farm Life and Accident Assurance Company (NY/CT/WI)
- State Farm County Mutual Insurance Company of Texas (TX auto)
- State Farm Mutual Insurance Company of Texas (TX preferred auto)
- State Farm Indemnity Company / State Farm Guaranty Insurance Company (NJ auto)
- State Farm General Insurance Company (CA home)
- State Farm Florida Insurance Company (FL home)
- Dover Bay Specialty Insurance Company
- State Farm Lloyds (TX home/commercial)
- State Farm Bank, F.S.B.
- State Farm Investment Management Corp. (SFIMC)
- State Farm VP Management Corp. (SFVPMC)
- State Farm International Service, Inc.
- State Farm Associate's Funds Trust
- State Farm Mutual Fund Trust
- SF Insurance Placement Corporation of Canada
- Insurance Placement Services, Inc.
- State Farm International Life Insurance Company Ltd.
- Plaza One Realty Co.
- State Farm Specialty Insurance Company
- State Farm Guaranty Insurance Company
- State Farm Variable Product Trust
- HiRoad Assurance Company
- Amberjack Ltd. (Real Estate)

=== Former ===
- State Farm Insurance of Canada – Based in Aurora, Ontario, was transferred to Desjardins Insurance in 2015 and completed by 2019. State Farm Finance Corporation Canada and State Farm Investor Services Canada Co. will merge into Desjardins as well.

== Marketing and promotions ==
=== Jingle ===
The State Farm jingle ("Like a good neighbor, State Farm is there") was written by American singer-songwriter Barry Manilow in 1971. A cover was released by Weezer in 2011. State Farm's first commercial jingle was created for The Jack Benny Program in the 1960s.

=== Television ads ===
In June 2011, State Farm premiered its "Get to a Better State" campaign. This campaign focuses on making humor out of unfortunate problems that are commonly faced. These commercials then make light of the situation by demonstrating how easy it is to contact an agent and correct the problem that has occurred. Each of these commercials follows a similar structure. A group of one to three people find themselves in an unfortunate situation. Someone in the group will then call on their State Farm agent by singing the jingle "Like a good neighbor, State Farm is there". A State Farm agent will then appear, as if by magic, and help the group out with their problem. A few commercials deviate from this structure, but still follow the same ultimate pattern.

The post-2020 Jake from State Farm played by Kevin Miles (top) and the original Jake in the 2011 commercial.

Also in 2011, State Farm premiered its "State of..." advertising campaign. One notable commercial, "State of Unrest", shows a man awake at 3:00 in the morning on the phone with a State Farm representative. The man's wife sees him talking on the phone in a secretive manner. She is suspicious and asks who is on the phone, to which her husband says: "It's Jake from State Farm" (the original Jake from State Farm was portrayed by Jake Stone, who was an actual employee of the company). The man's wife then takes the phone and asks, "What are you wearing, 'Jake from State Farm?'", to which the male agent responds in a timid way, "Uh, khakis". The undaunted wife says, "She sounds hideous", and the husband replies, "Well she's a guy, so..." In May 2015, a variation of "State of Unrest" premiered, starring The Coneheads from Saturday Night Live, with Dan Aykroyd and Jane Curtin reprising their respective roles as Beldar and Prymaat. This ad series later added Laraine Newman as Connie. Other SNL characters who have appeared in State Farm commercials include the Richmeister, Hans and Franz, and the Superfans.

In late 2014, State Farm released a critically acclaimed commercial showing a man who says that he will "never" do something (such as getting married, having kids, moving to the suburbs, and buying a minivan), only to do all of those. At the end of the commercial, he admits that he is "never letting go." The commercial is based on the saying "never say never" and how people say that they will "never" do something, only to do it anyway.

In 2015, State Farm released The Hoopers, a series of State Farm commercials focusing on a family, including NBA players Chris Paul playing the father, DeAndre Jordan playing the mother, Kevin Love playing the son, Kevin Garnett playing the grandfather and Damian Lillard playing the baby. Additionally, a State Farm agent plays the role of a helpful neighbor in the set of commercials.

Kevin Miles as "Jake from State Farm" with a cardboard cutout of his own face

In 2020, Kevin Miles took over the role of Jake from State Farm from Jake Stone in a series of commercials, the first ad airing before Super Bowl LIV, as a reimagining of the original 2011 "State of Unrest" commercial from the "State of..." campaign. Craig Miller of State Farm's agency The Marketing Arm said the character was so popular people were still dressing as him for Halloween. Jake from State Farm, who wears a red shirt and khakis, appeared in different settings, including a beekeeper outfit and a parody of The Bachelorette, and in a number commercials with celebrities, including Alfonso Ribeiro, Chris Paul, Aaron Rodgers and Paul Rudd. On his first anniversary as Jake, Miles appeared in a commercial during Super Bowl LV in which Drake appeared as his stand-in. According to Marketing Arm, Jake is better known than Katie Couric or Hilary Swank and 80 percent of those who know him like him. A report by Semrush says that State Farm was the top digital advertiser in Finance in 2023.

USA Today's Ad Meter selected State Farm's entry "Like a Good Neighbaaa" as the top ad in Super Bowl LVIII. The spot features Arnold Schwarzenegger struggling with the word "neighbor" in the company's tagline until he gets assistance from his Twins co-star Danny DeVito as well as Jake from State Farm.

In 2025, State Farm launched the Batman vs. Bateman campaign featuring Batman and associated DC Comics characters. The ads had Jake explaining that not getting State Farm was the equivalent of getting "Bateman instead of Batman". The ads had Batman, played by Nicholas Hayner, having to bail out actor Jason Bateman in his futile attempt at being a superhero. The ads also featured singer SZA as Catwoman, and internet stars Jordan Howlett and Kai Cenat as Jim Gordon and a Gotham City citizen, respectively. Other characters appear with Josh Harp as Joker, Andrew Tippie as Two-Face, Josh Meyer as Riddler, and Abbey May as Poison Ivy.

=== Sponsorships ===
- State Farm Stadium, a football stadium in Glendale, Arizona, and home of the Arizona Cardinals of the National Football League
- State Farm Arena, a multi-purpose arena and home of the Atlanta Hawks of the National Basketball Association
- State Farm Center, a multi-purpose arena and home of the University of Illinois at Urbana–Champaign men's and women's basketball teams
- State Farm Hall, a classroom building at Illinois Wesleyan University in Bloomington, Illinois
- State Farm Hall of Business, College of Business Building at Illinois State University in Normal, Illinois, since 2010
- State Farm Holiday Classic, an annual high school holiday basketball tournament held in Bloomington-Normal, Illinois each December
- State Farm Lone Star Showdown, moniker for all varsity athletics competitions between Texas A&M University and The University of Texas at Austin
- State Farm Research and Development Center, a research extension of State Farm Insurance located at the University of Illinois at Urbana-Champaign
- State Farm Sales Lab, a clinical sales training center at the University of Central Missouri, where the national State Farm Marketing and Sales Competition is held
- State Farm Computer Lab, a computer networking and software development room at the Mansfield University of Pennsylvania, where State Farm has sponsored the purchase of the majority of the equipment
- State Farm Territorial Cup Series, moniker for all varsity athletics competitions between the University of Arizona and Arizona State University
- NBA Cares Charity Challenge presented by State Farm, a charity program hosted by the NBA
- State Farm All-Star Saturday Night, skills competitions that feature NBA players
- League of Legends Championship Series, the North American branch of the League of Legends Professional League
- Overwatch League, the professional e-sports league for Overwatch
- All Elite Wrestling, an American professional wrestling promotion

=== Services ===
State Farm Safety Patrol – State Farm, in partnership with several U.S. highway authorities, operates a service called the State Farm Safety Patrol which provides free roadside assistance to stranded motorists on participating highways. When a driver calls the designated telephone number for the Safety Patrol, they will respond and provide the following services: fuel refills, radiator refills, and engine oil refills. Most Safety Patrol personnel are also certified in CPR and Automated External Defibrillator. They work to reduce accident rates, minimize the duration time of incidents, assist disabled drivers, and remove road debris. Turnpikes which currently participate include, Florida's Turnpike in the State of Florida and the Pennsylvania Turnpike in the Commonwealth of Pennsylvania. In Ohio, State Farm–branded safety patrol vans service major highways in the Cincinnati, Toledo, Cleveland, Columbus, Dayton, Akron, and Canton areas on weekdays.

State Farm won the 2020 Webby Award for Services & Utilities in the category Apps, Mobile & Voice.

== Criticism, controversies and viewpoints ==
=== Allegations of corporate influence and racketeering ===
==== $250 million settlement ====
The State Farm settlement, a racketeering class action concluded with a $250 million agreement, involved allegations of potential corporate influence on the Illinois Supreme Court. According to the lawsuit's amended complaint, State Farm was accused of leveraging its influence and financial contributions to nonprofits such as the U.S. Chamber and the Illinois Civil Justice League. The claim stated that this alleged influence played a role in the appointment of a specific justice to the Illinois Supreme Court in 2004. Subsequently, the justice joined four other state justices in overturning a billion-dollar judgment against State Farm. State Farm has consistently denied any wrongdoing and maintains that the claims are without merit.

=== Hurricane Katrina aftermath ===
==== Rigsby v. State Farm and $100 million settlement ====
In 2006, two former State Farm claims adjusters, sisters Cori and Kerri Rigsby, acted as whistleblowers and filed a qui tam suit against State Farm under the False Claims Act. The Rigsby sisters claimed that State Farm shifted state claims to federal flood insurance that should have been covered by private wind insurance, making the federal government and not State Farm liable for the insurance. In 2013, the Rigsbys won the fraud case focused on one Mississippi home; in 2016, the U.S. Supreme Court upheld the verdict. As part of the $100 million settlement, State Farm dismissed its counterclaims against the whistleblowers, alleging breaches of employment agreements and other laws. The federal government will receive the $100 million in restitution, not individual policyholders.

==== Wrongful denial of claims ====
A 2007 investigation by CNN reported that major car insurance companies, including State Farm and Allstate Insurance, were increasingly fighting claims of those alleging injury. Some injured parties argued these were unfair practices. State Farm and Allstate have denied these allegations. This followed on the heels of criminal investigations by the states of Louisiana and Mississippi, alleging that State Farm had wrongly denied claims stemming from Hurricane Katrina. Plaintiff's attorney Richard F "Dickie" Scruggs later pleaded guilty in March 2008 for his role in trying to pay Judge Henry Lackey of Mississippi a US$50,000 bribe for a favorable ruling in a related case involving a US$26.5 million settlement after Hurricane Katrina.

=== Florida potential withdrawal ===
In early 2009, the State Farm Florida subsidiary, the state's largest insurer, offered to withdraw from writing property insurance business in Florida after state regulators refused to approve a 47% property rate increase. State Farm said that, in Florida, it had paid out US$1.21 in claims for every dollar in premiums since 2000. Several other home insurers had also pulled out of Florida; many homeowners used the Citizens Property Insurance Corporation run by the state government. State Farm has since decided to remain in Florida, although with a reduced amount of property policies.

In 2010, State Farm and Renaissance jointly formed DaVinci Reinsurance Ltd. which insured more than 3.5 million homes in 2010.

=== Other lawsuits ===
==== Campbell v. State Farm ====
In 1981, Curtis Campbell caused an accident in which a man was killed and another was left permanently disabled. Both witnesses at the scene confirmed Campbell was at fault. State Farm contested liability and declined settlement offers from the victim's estates. State Farm assured Campbell that "their assets were safe, that they had no liability for the accident, that [State Farm] would represent their interests, and that they did not need to procure separate counsel." Despite State Farm contesting liability, the jury rendered a verdict that Campbell was 100 percent liable for the accident. State Farm refused to pay the excess amount or post a supersedeas bond to allow Campbell to appeal the verdict. Campbell obtained his own counsel to do this.

In 1984, while the appeal was ongoing, Campbell reached a settlement with the victim's estate, where Campbell would pursue an insurance bad faith action against State Farm. The attorneys for the victim's estate would represent Campbell in the bad-faith suit.

In 1989, Campbell's appeal was denied by the Utah Supreme Court. State Farm then paid the entire amount of the judgment, including the excess amount they previously denied to pay. Campbell proceeded to file suit against State Farm for bad faith, fraud, and intentional infliction of emotional distress. The Utah Supreme Court reinstated a $145 million punitive verdict against State Farm, making note that an earlier $100 million judgment was unreported to State Farm's corporate headquarters. The regional vice president had no plans to report said judgment under review.

==== Radcliff v. State Farm ====
Following the Good Friday 2006 hailstorm in Indiana that resulted in over $1 billion in property damages, State Farm faced approximately 50,000 claims for damage, out of which it rejected more than 7,000 claims. Joseph Radcliff, a roofer who established a company to repair homes damaged by the storm, was hired by around 300 State Farm policyholders. During his work, Radcliff observed that some of his clients, whose claims had been denied by State Farm, resided next to homeowners whose claims had been approved by other insurance companies. Radcliff reported State Farm to the Indiana Department of Insurance.

In response, State Farm took legal action against Radcliff, labeling him as the defendant in a case where they accused him of fourteen felony counts, including corrupt business influence and attempted theft. State Farm based these charges on fabricated evidence claiming that Radcliff had vandalized roofs in order to file fraudulent insurance claims. However, all charges against Radcliff were eventually dismissed. Radcliff's business lost 385 out of 400 jobs as a result of the charges, despite them being dismissed.

In the subsequent legal proceedings, Radcliff countersued State Farm, alleging defamation, abuse of process, and interference with business relationships. The case advanced to a jury trial, where Radcliff was awarded $14.5 million. State Farm appealed the decision. Radcliff won on two appeal processes and was awarded $17 million in damages and interest.

==== Doherty v. State Farm ====
In a lawsuit filed by actress Shannen Doherty against State Farm, a federal jury in Los Angeles awarded her $6.3 million in damages. The lawsuit claimed that State Farm had failed to adequately compensate Doherty for the damage to her Malibu home caused by a California wildfire in 2018. The jury found that State Farm's denial of policy benefits for Doherty's property was unreasonable and lacked proper cause. State Farm expressed empathy for Doherty's health but disagreed with the jury's decision, indicating that they would explore legal options, including a possible appeal.

==== Cook v. State Farm ====
In 2015, Charles and Bernadette Cook were involved in a car crash where their vehicle struck an uninsured vehicle stopped sideways in their traffic lane. The Cooks had coverage through State Farm against uninsured motorists and filed a claim accordingly. According to their policy, State Farm was obligated to pay up to $250,000 per person or $500,000 per occurrence, with a personal liability limit of $1 million. State Farm refused to pay the awarded amounts of $100,000 for Charles Cook and $400,000 for Bernadette Cook when they pursued their claim. The insurer cited Illinois statute 215 ILCS 5/143a, which it claimed allowed them to reject awards exceeding $75,000, despite the awards falling within the policy limits. State Farm's refusal to pay led to a lawsuit filed by the Cooks against the company, alleging negligence in various aspects of the claims process. Additionally, it was claimed that during arbitration, State Farm's lawyer introduced personal information that had been excluded as evidence, which was considered "willful and wanton conduct." State Farm agreed to a settlement of $650,000 and dropped its own suit against Bernadette Cook. The settlement amount is believed to be the largest reported for a bad faith claim against State Farm in Illinois.

==== Julian v. State Farm ====
State Farm was hit with a class-action lawsuit in California for allegedly breaching its contracts with drivers. The lead plaintiff, Joan St. Julian, claims that State Farm violated the law by failing to pay sales tax to drivers when reimbursing them for the "actual cash value" of their cars that were deemed total losses. According to the lawsuit, State Farm systematically underpaid claims made by thousands of consumers who experienced total vehicle loss. The lawsuit alleges that State Farm processed around 115,000 total loss claims during the relevant period, with approximately 10 percent of those claims not being paid the sales tax owed.

=== Wildfire and hailstorm damages ===
==== State Farm pulls out of California due to wildfire risk ====
As of May 27, 2023, State Farm has ceased accepting new applicants for business and personal casualty insurance in California. State Farm states that this decision was made due to "historic increases in construction costs outpacing inflation, rapidly growing catastrophe exposure, and a challenging reinsurance market." California has had over 15,000 wildfires from 2021 to 2023, partially due to a dry, windy and hot climate. More than 2.7 million people live in "very high fire hazard severity zones". In May 2026, California Insurance Commissioner Ricardo Lara announced that the state was seeking millions of dollars in penalties against State Farm following a regulatory investigation into the company's handling of claims arising from the January 2025 Los Angeles-area wildfires, including the Palisades and Eaton fires. The California Department of Insurance reviewed 220 randomly selected claims and identified nearly 400 violations, including underpayment and inadequate or delayed claims processing. State Farm received more than 11,000 claims from the wildfires, representing approximately one-third of all claims filed statewide. Lara initiated the investigation in June 2025 after policyholders reported delays and mishandling of claims related to home damage and smoke contamination. The final penalty amount was to be recommended by an administrative judge and finalized by the commissioner. State Farm was the second insurer to face state action over its LA wildfire claims handling; the California FAIR Plan faced separate proceedings over the denial of smoke damage claims.

==== State Farm denies claims for hail damage ====
Several lawsuits in Oklahoma alleges State Farm failing to pay out claims for hail damage in 2024. As of April 2026, more than 600 lawsuits were pending against State Farm in Oklahoma alone.

==== East Troublesome fire ====
Several survivors of the East Troublesome Fire in October 2020 have filed lawsuits against State Farm, alleging that the company underestimated the costs of rebuilding and delayed claim payments. One attorney representing two families, stated that numerous families were experiencing delays of up to a year in receiving payment from State Farm. Another plaintiff alleged that State Farm undervalued his home by less than half the actual rebuilding cost and delayed payment for the coverage of personal property. The lawsuits cite Colorado's statute that penalizes insurance companies for unreasonable payment delays.

==== Tubbs fire ====
The Tubbs Fire occurred in October 2017. It was one of California's most destructive fires, burning 36,810 acres (14,900 ha) and allegedly killing 22 people. Six months after the fire, a large number of people claimed that State Farm had refused to pay them in full despite losing everything they owned. To get their full payout, they had to create a detailed, item-by-item list of everything that was lost, or their payout was reduced by 25%. Policyholders stated that they received letters from State Farm suggesting that the California Code requires a listed inventory "for some time." The California Department of Insurance denied this requirement.

=== Plaintiff lawsuits ===
==== Jewish discrimination ====
In 1993, Todd Hindin filed a lawsuit against State Farm for allegedly keeping a list of prominent lawyers referred to within State Farm as the "Jewish Lawyers List". Any claims made by clients of these attorneys were automatically forwarded to State Farm's fraud unit, potentially on the basis of the religion and national origin of the lawyers. These claims would then be neither settled nor paid. State Farm initially claimed that this was not a matter of discrimination, but of coincidence. Frank Taylor, an experienced economist on retainer for the Appellants, argued that though the states involved contained 2-5% Jewish populations, the list contained 14% religiously or ethnically Jewish lawyers. People who had worked for State Farm, including former Divisional Claim Superintendent Ron Middler, testified that the list was potentially used to screen the lawyers mentioned in the list. State Farm paid out $30 million to Todd Hindin and his clients for discrimination on the basis of religion and national origin.

Documents that Hindin uncovered would assist in another case in 2003, Campbell v. State Farm, in which State Farm had to pay out $145 million in punitive damages (later reduced by the U.S. Supreme Court) after acting in bad faith. State Farm had to pay damages to the families of two car crash victims for whom Campbell was responsible, despite originally informing him and his family "that their assets were safe, that they had no liability for the accident, that [State Farm] would represent their interests, and that they did not need to procure separate counsel".

==== New York City garage lawsuit ====
On April 18, 2023, a parking garage in Manhattan's Financial District collapsed. The collapse killed one worker and injured five others, as well as crushing the cars in the garage. A total of 43 of the damaged cars were insured by State Farm policyholders, to which State Farm paid out $1.5 million in payments to the garage's customers whose vehicles were damaged in the collapse. State Farm alleged that the owners "failed to properly operate, manage, maintain and/or control the garage", thus resulting in the collapse.

==== 5.4 million RICO suit against doctors ====
In a civil RICO suit filed in 2005, State Farm was awarded over $15.4 million by a federal jury in a case involving alleged medical fraud. Arnold Lincow, an osteopathic doctor, along with eight other defendants, were accused of inflating patients' medical bills to defraud insurers systematically. State Farm claimed in court documents that Lincow devised a scheme to inflate the medical bills of car accident victims by prescribing unnecessary tests, treatments, prescriptions, and medical equipment. The scheme allegedly involved fabricating treatment records, falsifying injury descriptions, and submitting bills for services not rendered. Lincow was accused of directing other doctors and employees to perform medically inappropriate and unnecessary services. According to the lawsuit, Lincow also hired Sacks to misinterpret diagnostic tests as positive to exhaust available medical coverage. Additionally, Lincow was accused of orchestrating a kickback scheme with Hirsh's pharmacy, filling unnecessary prescriptions in exchange for inflated rent payments. All nine defendants were found to participate in a RICO conspiracy, committing both common law and statutory insurance fraud.

=== Violation of privacy laws ===
On July 19, 2023, plaintiffs Mary Brown, Andy Velazquez, William Midgett, and Diane Coughlin took legal action by initiating a class action lawsuit in Cook County Circuit Court against State Farm. This legal action is rooted in allegations of State Farm's violation of Illinois privacy rights laws. The plaintiffs are individuals who were involved in accidents with drivers insured by State Farm.

The core of their claim revolves around the alleged sharing of their personal health information with Insurance Services Office Inc. (ISO), a company specializing in comprehensive risk management analysis, supported by an extensive database. Both federal HIPAA law and the Illinois state constitution expressly forbid the disclosure of health information without an individual's explicit consent.

The plaintiffs maintain that ISO benefited financially by accumulating personal information for utilization within the insurance industry, including by State Farm.

=== Gender discrimination ===
In a sex discrimination lawsuit against State Farm in 1985, Judge Thelton Henderson approved a settlement that required the company to pay up to $420,000 each to women who were denied jobs as insurance agents in California due to gender discrimination. The settlement, limited to California residents due to the class action nature of the lawsuit, also stipulates that women must receive 50 percent of the available sales agent positions at State Farm in California over the next 10 years.

=== Disability discrimination ===
In July 2023, Elisa Brown, who was employed by State Farm for 20 years, sued State Farm alleging "discrimination and retaliation" because of her bladder disability. Brown was diagnosed with overactive bladder syndrome in February 2020, suffering from urinary incontinence.

Brown claims that State Farm met her initial need for accommodations. After a few months, however, her supervisor prohibited her from taking unscheduled breaks, and her breaks were monitored. After reaching out to State Farm's human resources with no resolution, she reached out to the Equal Employment Opportunity Commission. After notifying HR about her contacting the EEOC, Brown was terminated from her State Farm position.

=== Racial discrimination ===
There have been several allegations and lawsuits of racial discrimination against State Farm. One lawsuit, filed in 2020, describes a pattern of discrimination against seven agents of color by the company, citing a study done by The Center on Race, Inequality and the Law at the NYU School of Law. According to the survey, it was found that Black homeowners were required to complete more paperwork and engage in more interactions with claims adjusters before State Farm would approve their claims. The survey revealed that Black customers had a 20% higher likelihood of having to communicate with a State Farm representative on at least three separate occasions before their claims were accepted. Additionally, they were more frequently asked to provide supplementary documentation for their claims. Another lawsuit, filed more recently by a former Indian American employee, accuses co-workers of racial harassment.

In 2019, Darryl Williams, an African American property owner, filed a discrimination lawsuit against State Farm, seeking class action certification. Williams had filed an insurance claim for damage caused by a burst pipe in one of his buildings. He felt that he was treated unfairly based on his race, as a State Farm claims adjuster reportedly expressed skepticism about his version of events, citing a high level of fraud in his area. State Farm eventually paid only a fraction of his claim, leading Williams to sell his buildings to cover his expenses.

Carla Campbell-Jackson, a former State Farm employee, filed a federal lawsuit in December, alleging discrimination, a hostile work environment, and retaliation. Campbell-Jackson came forward to support Darryl Williams' case, stating that State Farm had a system in place to minimize losses by classifying many claims as fraud in Black areas. State Farm has denied the accusations and states that recent allegations of discrimination do not reflect the company's culture. However, the Equal Employment Opportunity Commission (EEOC) ruled in favor of Campbell-Jackson, determining that State Farm had discriminated against her. The EEOC recommended that State Farm pay Campbell-Jackson around $500,000 in damages and back pay, but no agreement has been reached.

=== Overcharging on premiums ===
An administrative law judge at the California Department of Insurance ordered State Farm to issue refunds and reduce rates after being found guilty of overcharging customers by $85 million. The judge concluded that State Farm's premiums for homeowners insurance have been excessively high since July 15, 2015. The ruling orders State Farm to refund policyholders for overcharges collected after that date and reduce its homeowners insurance rates by 7 percent.

=== Climate change ===
Under CEO Michael L. Tipsord, State Farm has announced a Green Mission to "lead by example" in environmental philanthropy. Ceres has found that State Farm invests millions of US dollars to finance energy companies. Others place State Farm's fossil fuel investments at US$22.4 million. State Farm was viewed as not considering climate change in their investments.

In order to rectify the situation and show its green credentials, State Farm has committed to reducing its greenhouse gas emissions by 50% by 2030. 80% of State Farm facilities now have an Energy Star score of 75% or higher; this is significantly above the average for Fortune 50 companies.

=== LGBT ===
On May 24, 2022, State Farm ended its partnership with GenderCool, an organization that seeks to raise awareness of "transgender and non-binary youth", after receiving backlash from right-wing and conservative political figures and media outlets.

== See also ==
- Desjardins Group
- Desjardins Insurance
- List of United States insurance companies
- State Farm Downtown Building
